

562001–562100 

|-bgcolor=#fefefe
| 562001 ||  || — || June 26, 2011 || Mount Lemmon || Mount Lemmon Survey ||  || align=right data-sort-value="0.62" | 620 m || 
|-id=002 bgcolor=#E9E9E9
| 562002 ||  || — || July 27, 2014 || Haleakala || Pan-STARRS ||  || align=right data-sort-value="0.81" | 810 m || 
|-id=003 bgcolor=#E9E9E9
| 562003 ||  || — || January 14, 2012 || Mayhill-ISON || L. Elenin ||  || align=right | 2.5 km || 
|-id=004 bgcolor=#E9E9E9
| 562004 ||  || — || February 13, 2008 || Kitt Peak || Spacewatch ||  || align=right data-sort-value="0.93" | 930 m || 
|-id=005 bgcolor=#d6d6d6
| 562005 ||  || — || June 27, 2014 || Haleakala || Pan-STARRS ||  || align=right | 2.8 km || 
|-id=006 bgcolor=#fefefe
| 562006 ||  || — || December 1, 2015 || Haleakala || Pan-STARRS ||  || align=right data-sort-value="0.64" | 640 m || 
|-id=007 bgcolor=#E9E9E9
| 562007 ||  || — || November 8, 2007 || Mount Lemmon || Mount Lemmon Survey ||  || align=right | 1.1 km || 
|-id=008 bgcolor=#fefefe
| 562008 Samtackeff ||  ||  || October 9, 2004 || Kitt Peak || Spacewatch ||  || align=right data-sort-value="0.69" | 690 m || 
|-id=009 bgcolor=#E9E9E9
| 562009 ||  || — || December 21, 2011 || Crni Vrh || J. Skvarč ||  || align=right | 1.1 km || 
|-id=010 bgcolor=#E9E9E9
| 562010 ||  || — || November 28, 2011 || Kitt Peak || Spacewatch ||  || align=right data-sort-value="0.77" | 770 m || 
|-id=011 bgcolor=#E9E9E9
| 562011 ||  || — || May 4, 2009 || Kitt Peak || Spacewatch ||  || align=right data-sort-value="0.89" | 890 m || 
|-id=012 bgcolor=#E9E9E9
| 562012 ||  || — || December 1, 2015 || Haleakala || Pan-STARRS ||  || align=right data-sort-value="0.88" | 880 m || 
|-id=013 bgcolor=#E9E9E9
| 562013 ||  || — || April 2, 2013 || Mount Lemmon || Mount Lemmon Survey ||  || align=right | 1.3 km || 
|-id=014 bgcolor=#E9E9E9
| 562014 ||  || — || June 27, 2014 || Haleakala || Pan-STARRS ||  || align=right data-sort-value="0.80" | 800 m || 
|-id=015 bgcolor=#E9E9E9
| 562015 ||  || — || October 13, 2002 || Palomar || NEAT ||  || align=right | 2.7 km || 
|-id=016 bgcolor=#E9E9E9
| 562016 ||  || — || December 6, 2011 || Haleakala || Pan-STARRS ||  || align=right data-sort-value="0.85" | 850 m || 
|-id=017 bgcolor=#E9E9E9
| 562017 ||  || — || April 2, 2009 || Kitt Peak || Spacewatch ||  || align=right data-sort-value="0.85" | 850 m || 
|-id=018 bgcolor=#fefefe
| 562018 ||  || — || October 8, 2015 || Haleakala || Pan-STARRS ||  || align=right data-sort-value="0.71" | 710 m || 
|-id=019 bgcolor=#E9E9E9
| 562019 ||  || — || May 7, 2014 || Haleakala || Pan-STARRS ||  || align=right | 1.3 km || 
|-id=020 bgcolor=#fefefe
| 562020 ||  || — || September 7, 2011 || Kitt Peak || Spacewatch ||  || align=right data-sort-value="0.66" | 660 m || 
|-id=021 bgcolor=#fefefe
| 562021 ||  || — || November 21, 2008 || Kitt Peak || Spacewatch ||  || align=right data-sort-value="0.57" | 570 m || 
|-id=022 bgcolor=#E9E9E9
| 562022 ||  || — || March 27, 2008 || Mount Lemmon || Mount Lemmon Survey ||  || align=right | 1.2 km || 
|-id=023 bgcolor=#fefefe
| 562023 ||  || — || September 11, 2004 || Socorro || LINEAR ||  || align=right data-sort-value="0.89" | 890 m || 
|-id=024 bgcolor=#E9E9E9
| 562024 ||  || — || April 2, 2013 || Mount Lemmon || Mount Lemmon Survey ||  || align=right data-sort-value="0.81" | 810 m || 
|-id=025 bgcolor=#E9E9E9
| 562025 ||  || — || March 23, 2003 || Desert Moon || B. L. Stevens ||  || align=right | 1.8 km || 
|-id=026 bgcolor=#E9E9E9
| 562026 ||  || — || November 18, 2015 || Mount Lemmon || Pan-STARRS ||  || align=right data-sort-value="0.76" | 760 m || 
|-id=027 bgcolor=#E9E9E9
| 562027 ||  || — || December 30, 2011 || Catalina || CSS ||  || align=right | 3.6 km || 
|-id=028 bgcolor=#E9E9E9
| 562028 ||  || — || October 30, 2006 || Catalina || CSS ||  || align=right | 1.8 km || 
|-id=029 bgcolor=#E9E9E9
| 562029 ||  || — || September 2, 2010 || Mount Lemmon || Mount Lemmon Survey ||  || align=right data-sort-value="0.91" | 910 m || 
|-id=030 bgcolor=#E9E9E9
| 562030 ||  || — || April 12, 2013 || Haleakala || Pan-STARRS ||  || align=right data-sort-value="0.91" | 910 m || 
|-id=031 bgcolor=#fefefe
| 562031 ||  || — || September 14, 2007 || Mount Lemmon || Mount Lemmon Survey ||  || align=right data-sort-value="0.77" | 770 m || 
|-id=032 bgcolor=#E9E9E9
| 562032 ||  || — || April 7, 2008 || Catalina || CSS ||  || align=right | 1.6 km || 
|-id=033 bgcolor=#E9E9E9
| 562033 ||  || — || October 19, 2015 || Haleakala || Pan-STARRS ||  || align=right | 1.0 km || 
|-id=034 bgcolor=#E9E9E9
| 562034 ||  || — || June 4, 2013 || Mount Lemmon || Mount Lemmon Survey ||  || align=right | 1.6 km || 
|-id=035 bgcolor=#E9E9E9
| 562035 ||  || — || June 1, 2009 || Mount Lemmon || Mount Lemmon Survey ||  || align=right data-sort-value="0.90" | 900 m || 
|-id=036 bgcolor=#E9E9E9
| 562036 ||  || — || February 8, 2008 || Kitt Peak || Spacewatch ||  || align=right | 1.3 km || 
|-id=037 bgcolor=#E9E9E9
| 562037 ||  || — || November 17, 2006 || Mount Lemmon || Mount Lemmon Survey ||  || align=right | 1.4 km || 
|-id=038 bgcolor=#E9E9E9
| 562038 ||  || — || October 2, 2010 || Charleston || R. Holmes ||  || align=right | 2.0 km || 
|-id=039 bgcolor=#E9E9E9
| 562039 ||  || — || October 9, 2005 || Kitt Peak || Spacewatch ||  || align=right | 2.4 km || 
|-id=040 bgcolor=#fefefe
| 562040 ||  || — || September 28, 2011 || Mount Lemmon || Mount Lemmon Survey ||  || align=right data-sort-value="0.69" | 690 m || 
|-id=041 bgcolor=#E9E9E9
| 562041 ||  || — || October 9, 2015 || Haleakala || Pan-STARRS ||  || align=right data-sort-value="0.68" | 680 m || 
|-id=042 bgcolor=#E9E9E9
| 562042 ||  || — || November 24, 2003 || Kitt Peak || Spacewatch ||  || align=right data-sort-value="0.70" | 700 m || 
|-id=043 bgcolor=#E9E9E9
| 562043 ||  || — || October 9, 2015 || Haleakala || Pan-STARRS ||  || align=right data-sort-value="0.83" | 830 m || 
|-id=044 bgcolor=#fefefe
| 562044 ||  || — || May 5, 2010 || Mount Lemmon || Mount Lemmon Survey ||  || align=right data-sort-value="0.68" | 680 m || 
|-id=045 bgcolor=#fefefe
| 562045 ||  || — || February 21, 2006 || Mount Lemmon || Mount Lemmon Survey ||  || align=right data-sort-value="0.73" | 730 m || 
|-id=046 bgcolor=#fefefe
| 562046 ||  || — || July 27, 2011 || Haleakala || Pan-STARRS ||  || align=right data-sort-value="0.67" | 670 m || 
|-id=047 bgcolor=#E9E9E9
| 562047 ||  || — || November 3, 2015 || Mount Lemmon || Mount Lemmon Survey ||  || align=right | 1.6 km || 
|-id=048 bgcolor=#E9E9E9
| 562048 ||  || — || November 18, 2015 || Kitt Peak || Spacewatch ||  || align=right data-sort-value="0.91" | 910 m || 
|-id=049 bgcolor=#fefefe
| 562049 ||  || — || September 23, 2011 || Haleakala || Pan-STARRS || V || align=right data-sort-value="0.59" | 590 m || 
|-id=050 bgcolor=#E9E9E9
| 562050 ||  || — || April 9, 2000 || Anderson Mesa || LONEOS ||  || align=right | 1.7 km || 
|-id=051 bgcolor=#E9E9E9
| 562051 ||  || — || December 4, 2015 || Haleakala || Pan-STARRS ||  || align=right data-sort-value="0.79" | 790 m || 
|-id=052 bgcolor=#E9E9E9
| 562052 ||  || — || June 18, 2013 || Haleakala || Pan-STARRS ||  || align=right data-sort-value="0.98" | 980 m || 
|-id=053 bgcolor=#E9E9E9
| 562053 ||  || — || March 28, 2008 || Mount Lemmon || Mount Lemmon Survey ||  || align=right | 1.4 km || 
|-id=054 bgcolor=#d6d6d6
| 562054 ||  || — || November 16, 2010 || Catalina || CSS ||  || align=right | 3.0 km || 
|-id=055 bgcolor=#E9E9E9
| 562055 ||  || — || January 6, 2012 || Kitt Peak || Spacewatch ||  || align=right | 1.4 km || 
|-id=056 bgcolor=#E9E9E9
| 562056 ||  || — || January 11, 2008 || Kitt Peak || Spacewatch ||  || align=right data-sort-value="0.77" | 770 m || 
|-id=057 bgcolor=#fefefe
| 562057 ||  || — || July 3, 2011 || Mount Lemmon || Mount Lemmon Survey ||  || align=right data-sort-value="0.69" | 690 m || 
|-id=058 bgcolor=#E9E9E9
| 562058 ||  || — || July 4, 2014 || Haleakala || Pan-STARRS ||  || align=right data-sort-value="0.93" | 930 m || 
|-id=059 bgcolor=#fefefe
| 562059 ||  || — || December 9, 2004 || Kitt Peak || Spacewatch ||  || align=right data-sort-value="0.69" | 690 m || 
|-id=060 bgcolor=#E9E9E9
| 562060 ||  || — || October 30, 2005 || Kitt Peak || Spacewatch ||  || align=right | 1.8 km || 
|-id=061 bgcolor=#E9E9E9
| 562061 ||  || — || January 11, 2008 || Kitt Peak || Spacewatch ||  || align=right | 1.1 km || 
|-id=062 bgcolor=#E9E9E9
| 562062 ||  || — || January 16, 2008 || Kitt Peak || Spacewatch ||  || align=right | 1.1 km || 
|-id=063 bgcolor=#E9E9E9
| 562063 ||  || — || March 27, 2009 || Kitt Peak || Spacewatch ||  || align=right data-sort-value="0.89" | 890 m || 
|-id=064 bgcolor=#E9E9E9
| 562064 ||  || — || May 31, 2014 || Haleakala || Pan-STARRS ||  || align=right data-sort-value="0.89" | 890 m || 
|-id=065 bgcolor=#E9E9E9
| 562065 ||  || — || August 3, 2014 || Haleakala || Pan-STARRS ||  || align=right data-sort-value="0.74" | 740 m || 
|-id=066 bgcolor=#fefefe
| 562066 ||  || — || December 22, 2008 || Kitt Peak || Spacewatch ||  || align=right data-sort-value="0.63" | 630 m || 
|-id=067 bgcolor=#fefefe
| 562067 ||  || — || September 29, 2008 || Mount Lemmon || Mount Lemmon Survey ||  || align=right data-sort-value="0.72" | 720 m || 
|-id=068 bgcolor=#E9E9E9
| 562068 ||  || — || April 16, 2013 || Haleakala || Pan-STARRS ||  || align=right | 1.2 km || 
|-id=069 bgcolor=#d6d6d6
| 562069 ||  || — || December 4, 2015 || Mount Lemmon || Mount Lemmon Survey ||  || align=right | 2.3 km || 
|-id=070 bgcolor=#E9E9E9
| 562070 ||  || — || December 4, 2007 || Kitt Peak || Spacewatch ||  || align=right data-sort-value="0.60" | 600 m || 
|-id=071 bgcolor=#fefefe
| 562071 ||  || — || August 24, 2011 || La Sagra || OAM Obs. ||  || align=right data-sort-value="0.61" | 610 m || 
|-id=072 bgcolor=#E9E9E9
| 562072 ||  || — || September 4, 2010 || Mount Lemmon || Mount Lemmon Survey ||  || align=right | 1.2 km || 
|-id=073 bgcolor=#E9E9E9
| 562073 ||  || — || September 23, 2015 || Haleakala || Pan-STARRS ||  || align=right | 1.3 km || 
|-id=074 bgcolor=#fefefe
| 562074 ||  || — || January 30, 2009 || Mount Lemmon || Mount Lemmon Survey ||  || align=right data-sort-value="0.64" | 640 m || 
|-id=075 bgcolor=#E9E9E9
| 562075 ||  || — || November 17, 2011 || Kitt Peak || Spacewatch ||  || align=right data-sort-value="0.73" | 730 m || 
|-id=076 bgcolor=#fefefe
| 562076 ||  || — || December 4, 2015 || Mount Lemmon || Mount Lemmon Survey ||  || align=right data-sort-value="0.68" | 680 m || 
|-id=077 bgcolor=#E9E9E9
| 562077 ||  || — || February 13, 2004 || Kitt Peak || Spacewatch ||  || align=right | 1.6 km || 
|-id=078 bgcolor=#E9E9E9
| 562078 ||  || — || September 4, 2014 || Haleakala || Pan-STARRS ||  || align=right | 1.4 km || 
|-id=079 bgcolor=#E9E9E9
| 562079 ||  || — || July 21, 2006 || Mount Lemmon || Mount Lemmon Survey ||  || align=right | 2.9 km || 
|-id=080 bgcolor=#E9E9E9
| 562080 ||  || — || February 12, 2008 || Mount Lemmon || Mount Lemmon Survey ||  || align=right | 1.3 km || 
|-id=081 bgcolor=#E9E9E9
| 562081 ||  || — || September 23, 2015 || Haleakala || Pan-STARRS ||  || align=right | 1.5 km || 
|-id=082 bgcolor=#E9E9E9
| 562082 ||  || — || December 16, 2011 || Mount Lemmon || Mount Lemmon Survey ||  || align=right | 2.7 km || 
|-id=083 bgcolor=#E9E9E9
| 562083 ||  || — || January 14, 2008 || Kitt Peak || Spacewatch ||  || align=right | 1.2 km || 
|-id=084 bgcolor=#d6d6d6
| 562084 ||  || — || December 5, 2015 || Haleakala || Pan-STARRS ||  || align=right | 2.5 km || 
|-id=085 bgcolor=#E9E9E9
| 562085 ||  || — || October 23, 2011 || Haleakala || Pan-STARRS ||  || align=right data-sort-value="0.96" | 960 m || 
|-id=086 bgcolor=#E9E9E9
| 562086 ||  || — || January 27, 2004 || Kitt Peak || Spacewatch ||  || align=right data-sort-value="0.83" | 830 m || 
|-id=087 bgcolor=#E9E9E9
| 562087 ||  || — || March 16, 2013 || Kitt Peak || Spacewatch ||  || align=right | 1.1 km || 
|-id=088 bgcolor=#E9E9E9
| 562088 ||  || — || January 30, 2004 || Kitt Peak || Spacewatch ||  || align=right data-sort-value="0.66" | 660 m || 
|-id=089 bgcolor=#E9E9E9
| 562089 ||  || — || September 14, 2010 || Mount Lemmon || Mount Lemmon Survey ||  || align=right | 1.5 km || 
|-id=090 bgcolor=#E9E9E9
| 562090 ||  || — || November 12, 2015 || Catalina || CSS || EUN || align=right | 1.4 km || 
|-id=091 bgcolor=#FA8072
| 562091 ||  || — || August 3, 2015 || Haleakala || Pan-STARRS ||  || align=right data-sort-value="0.84" | 840 m || 
|-id=092 bgcolor=#E9E9E9
| 562092 ||  || — || January 30, 2012 || Mount Lemmon || Mount Lemmon Survey ||  || align=right | 2.3 km || 
|-id=093 bgcolor=#E9E9E9
| 562093 ||  || — || April 15, 2013 || Haleakala || Pan-STARRS ||  || align=right data-sort-value="0.90" | 900 m || 
|-id=094 bgcolor=#E9E9E9
| 562094 ||  || — || December 27, 2003 || Kitt Peak || Spacewatch ||  || align=right data-sort-value="0.60" | 600 m || 
|-id=095 bgcolor=#E9E9E9
| 562095 ||  || — || January 13, 2008 || Mount Lemmon || Mount Lemmon Survey ||  || align=right data-sort-value="0.80" | 800 m || 
|-id=096 bgcolor=#E9E9E9
| 562096 ||  || — || December 30, 2007 || Kitt Peak || Spacewatch ||  || align=right data-sort-value="0.83" | 830 m || 
|-id=097 bgcolor=#E9E9E9
| 562097 ||  || — || April 27, 2009 || Mount Lemmon || Mount Lemmon Survey ||  || align=right data-sort-value="0.71" | 710 m || 
|-id=098 bgcolor=#E9E9E9
| 562098 ||  || — || March 19, 2013 || Haleakala || Pan-STARRS ||  || align=right data-sort-value="0.74" | 740 m || 
|-id=099 bgcolor=#d6d6d6
| 562099 ||  || — || July 8, 2014 || Haleakala || Pan-STARRS ||  || align=right | 2.0 km || 
|-id=100 bgcolor=#fefefe
| 562100 ||  || — || September 15, 2007 || Kitt Peak || Spacewatch ||  || align=right data-sort-value="0.69" | 690 m || 
|}

562101–562200 

|-bgcolor=#d6d6d6
| 562101 ||  || — || September 23, 2009 || Kitt Peak || Spacewatch ||  || align=right | 1.9 km || 
|-id=102 bgcolor=#fefefe
| 562102 ||  || — || September 26, 1992 || Kitt Peak || Spacewatch ||  || align=right data-sort-value="0.75" | 750 m || 
|-id=103 bgcolor=#fefefe
| 562103 ||  || — || May 19, 2014 || Haleakala || Pan-STARRS ||  || align=right data-sort-value="0.80" | 800 m || 
|-id=104 bgcolor=#E9E9E9
| 562104 ||  || — || November 15, 2007 || Catalina || CSS ||  || align=right | 1.0 km || 
|-id=105 bgcolor=#fefefe
| 562105 ||  || — || May 28, 2014 || Haleakala || Pan-STARRS ||  || align=right data-sort-value="0.64" | 640 m || 
|-id=106 bgcolor=#E9E9E9
| 562106 ||  || — || March 13, 2013 || Palomar || PTF ||  || align=right | 1.1 km || 
|-id=107 bgcolor=#E9E9E9
| 562107 ||  || — || January 15, 2008 || Mount Lemmon || Mount Lemmon Survey || (5) || align=right data-sort-value="0.84" | 840 m || 
|-id=108 bgcolor=#E9E9E9
| 562108 ||  || — || December 29, 2011 || Mount Lemmon || Mount Lemmon Survey ||  || align=right | 1.3 km || 
|-id=109 bgcolor=#E9E9E9
| 562109 ||  || — || January 11, 2008 || Kitt Peak || Spacewatch ||  || align=right data-sort-value="0.72" | 720 m || 
|-id=110 bgcolor=#E9E9E9
| 562110 ||  || — || November 23, 2002 || Palomar || NEAT || (1547) || align=right | 1.3 km || 
|-id=111 bgcolor=#E9E9E9
| 562111 ||  || — || April 16, 2005 || Kitt Peak || Spacewatch ||  || align=right data-sort-value="0.76" | 760 m || 
|-id=112 bgcolor=#fefefe
| 562112 ||  || — || May 26, 2007 || Siding Spring || SSS ||  || align=right data-sort-value="0.86" | 860 m || 
|-id=113 bgcolor=#E9E9E9
| 562113 ||  || — || November 24, 2003 || Kitt Peak || Spacewatch ||  || align=right data-sort-value="0.97" | 970 m || 
|-id=114 bgcolor=#E9E9E9
| 562114 ||  || — || November 25, 2011 || Haleakala || Pan-STARRS ||  || align=right | 1.3 km || 
|-id=115 bgcolor=#fefefe
| 562115 ||  || — || August 26, 2011 || Kitt Peak || Spacewatch ||  || align=right data-sort-value="0.65" | 650 m || 
|-id=116 bgcolor=#fefefe
| 562116 ||  || — || December 3, 2008 || Mount Lemmon || Mount Lemmon Survey ||  || align=right data-sort-value="0.70" | 700 m || 
|-id=117 bgcolor=#fefefe
| 562117 ||  || — || January 2, 2009 || Kitt Peak || Spacewatch || MAS || align=right data-sort-value="0.62" | 620 m || 
|-id=118 bgcolor=#E9E9E9
| 562118 ||  || — || February 12, 2012 || Haleakala || Pan-STARRS ||  || align=right | 1.8 km || 
|-id=119 bgcolor=#E9E9E9
| 562119 ||  || — || August 27, 2006 || Kitt Peak || Spacewatch ||  || align=right | 1.2 km || 
|-id=120 bgcolor=#fefefe
| 562120 ||  || — || February 17, 2013 || Kitt Peak || Spacewatch ||  || align=right data-sort-value="0.81" | 810 m || 
|-id=121 bgcolor=#fefefe
| 562121 ||  || — || January 20, 2009 || Kitt Peak || Spacewatch ||  || align=right data-sort-value="0.75" | 750 m || 
|-id=122 bgcolor=#E9E9E9
| 562122 ||  || — || January 1, 2008 || Kitt Peak || Spacewatch ||  || align=right data-sort-value="0.62" | 620 m || 
|-id=123 bgcolor=#fefefe
| 562123 ||  || — || November 22, 2015 || Mount Lemmon || Mount Lemmon Survey ||  || align=right data-sort-value="0.66" | 660 m || 
|-id=124 bgcolor=#E9E9E9
| 562124 ||  || — || November 25, 2011 || Haleakala || Pan-STARRS ||  || align=right data-sort-value="0.78" | 780 m || 
|-id=125 bgcolor=#E9E9E9
| 562125 ||  || — || November 11, 2007 || Mount Lemmon || Mount Lemmon Survey ||  || align=right data-sort-value="0.97" | 970 m || 
|-id=126 bgcolor=#E9E9E9
| 562126 ||  || — || June 1, 2013 || Haleakala || Pan-STARRS ||  || align=right | 2.0 km || 
|-id=127 bgcolor=#E9E9E9
| 562127 ||  || — || November 22, 2015 || Mount Lemmon || Mount Lemmon Survey ||  || align=right data-sort-value="0.65" | 650 m || 
|-id=128 bgcolor=#E9E9E9
| 562128 ||  || — || December 5, 2007 || Kitt Peak || Spacewatch ||  || align=right data-sort-value="0.64" | 640 m || 
|-id=129 bgcolor=#E9E9E9
| 562129 ||  || — || December 4, 2007 || Mount Lemmon || Mount Lemmon Survey ||  || align=right data-sort-value="0.87" | 870 m || 
|-id=130 bgcolor=#E9E9E9
| 562130 ||  || — || November 3, 2015 || Mount Lemmon || Mount Lemmon Survey ||  || align=right | 1.6 km || 
|-id=131 bgcolor=#fefefe
| 562131 ||  || — || September 20, 2011 || Kitt Peak || Spacewatch ||  || align=right data-sort-value="0.65" | 650 m || 
|-id=132 bgcolor=#fefefe
| 562132 ||  || — || September 8, 2011 || Kitt Peak || Spacewatch ||  || align=right data-sort-value="0.62" | 620 m || 
|-id=133 bgcolor=#fefefe
| 562133 ||  || — || December 1, 2008 || Kitt Peak || Spacewatch ||  || align=right data-sort-value="0.70" | 700 m || 
|-id=134 bgcolor=#E9E9E9
| 562134 ||  || — || May 4, 2005 || Mauna Kea || Mauna Kea Obs. ||  || align=right data-sort-value="0.75" | 750 m || 
|-id=135 bgcolor=#E9E9E9
| 562135 ||  || — || February 7, 2008 || Kitt Peak || Spacewatch ||  || align=right | 1.2 km || 
|-id=136 bgcolor=#E9E9E9
| 562136 ||  || — || July 24, 2015 || Haleakala || Pan-STARRS ||  || align=right | 1.0 km || 
|-id=137 bgcolor=#fefefe
| 562137 ||  || — || March 5, 2013 || Haleakala || Pan-STARRS ||  || align=right data-sort-value="0.81" | 810 m || 
|-id=138 bgcolor=#d6d6d6
| 562138 ||  || — || March 24, 2012 || Mount Lemmon || Mount Lemmon Survey ||  || align=right | 2.2 km || 
|-id=139 bgcolor=#fefefe
| 562139 ||  || — || September 23, 2011 || Haleakala || Pan-STARRS ||  || align=right data-sort-value="0.69" | 690 m || 
|-id=140 bgcolor=#E9E9E9
| 562140 ||  || — || August 28, 2014 || Mount Lemmon || Pan-STARRS ||  || align=right | 1.4 km || 
|-id=141 bgcolor=#fefefe
| 562141 ||  || — || September 20, 2011 || Mount Lemmon || Mount Lemmon Survey ||  || align=right data-sort-value="0.68" | 680 m || 
|-id=142 bgcolor=#fefefe
| 562142 ||  || — || October 26, 2011 || Haleakala || Pan-STARRS ||  || align=right data-sort-value="0.64" | 640 m || 
|-id=143 bgcolor=#E9E9E9
| 562143 ||  || — || December 30, 2011 || Mount Lemmon || Mount Lemmon Survey ||  || align=right | 1.0 km || 
|-id=144 bgcolor=#E9E9E9
| 562144 ||  || — || September 23, 2015 || Haleakala || Pan-STARRS ||  || align=right | 1.3 km || 
|-id=145 bgcolor=#E9E9E9
| 562145 ||  || — || December 6, 2015 || Haleakala || Pan-STARRS ||  || align=right data-sort-value="0.68" | 680 m || 
|-id=146 bgcolor=#fefefe
| 562146 ||  || — || December 6, 2015 || Haleakala || Pan-STARRS ||  || align=right data-sort-value="0.71" | 710 m || 
|-id=147 bgcolor=#E9E9E9
| 562147 ||  || — || November 22, 2015 || Mount Lemmon || Mount Lemmon Survey ||  || align=right data-sort-value="0.80" | 800 m || 
|-id=148 bgcolor=#E9E9E9
| 562148 ||  || — || January 18, 2008 || Kitt Peak || Spacewatch ||  || align=right | 1.2 km || 
|-id=149 bgcolor=#E9E9E9
| 562149 ||  || — || March 30, 2008 || Catalina || CSS ||  || align=right | 1.6 km || 
|-id=150 bgcolor=#fefefe
| 562150 ||  || — || September 25, 2011 || Haleakala || Pan-STARRS ||  || align=right data-sort-value="0.66" | 660 m || 
|-id=151 bgcolor=#E9E9E9
| 562151 ||  || — || February 26, 2009 || Kitt Peak || Spacewatch ||  || align=right data-sort-value="0.86" | 860 m || 
|-id=152 bgcolor=#E9E9E9
| 562152 ||  || — || September 14, 2010 || Mount Lemmon || Mount Lemmon Survey ||  || align=right data-sort-value="0.87" | 870 m || 
|-id=153 bgcolor=#E9E9E9
| 562153 ||  || — || September 17, 2010 || Kitt Peak || Spacewatch ||  || align=right | 1.0 km || 
|-id=154 bgcolor=#E9E9E9
| 562154 ||  || — || November 12, 2010 || Kitt Peak || Spacewatch ||  || align=right | 2.1 km || 
|-id=155 bgcolor=#d6d6d6
| 562155 ||  || — || May 10, 2007 || Mount Lemmon || Mount Lemmon Survey ||  || align=right | 2.4 km || 
|-id=156 bgcolor=#E9E9E9
| 562156 ||  || — || February 28, 2012 || Haleakala || Pan-STARRS ||  || align=right | 1.2 km || 
|-id=157 bgcolor=#E9E9E9
| 562157 ||  || — || December 6, 2015 || Haleakala || Pan-STARRS ||  || align=right | 1.2 km || 
|-id=158 bgcolor=#d6d6d6
| 562158 ||  || — || August 5, 2014 || Haleakala || Pan-STARRS ||  || align=right | 2.3 km || 
|-id=159 bgcolor=#E9E9E9
| 562159 ||  || — || October 17, 2006 || Catalina || CSS ||  || align=right | 1.2 km || 
|-id=160 bgcolor=#E9E9E9
| 562160 ||  || — || October 12, 2015 || ESA OGS || ESA OGS ||  || align=right data-sort-value="0.82" | 820 m || 
|-id=161 bgcolor=#E9E9E9
| 562161 ||  || — || January 18, 2008 || Kitt Peak || Spacewatch ||  || align=right | 1.5 km || 
|-id=162 bgcolor=#E9E9E9
| 562162 ||  || — || December 7, 2015 || Haleakala || Pan-STARRS ||  || align=right | 1.0 km || 
|-id=163 bgcolor=#fefefe
| 562163 ||  || — || September 28, 2003 || Kitt Peak || Spacewatch ||  || align=right data-sort-value="0.90" | 900 m || 
|-id=164 bgcolor=#fefefe
| 562164 ||  || — || April 14, 2010 || Mount Lemmon || Mount Lemmon Survey ||  || align=right data-sort-value="0.67" | 670 m || 
|-id=165 bgcolor=#E9E9E9
| 562165 ||  || — || November 11, 2007 || Mount Lemmon || Mount Lemmon Survey ||  || align=right data-sort-value="0.98" | 980 m || 
|-id=166 bgcolor=#E9E9E9
| 562166 ||  || — || December 26, 2011 || Kitt Peak || Spacewatch ||  || align=right | 1.1 km || 
|-id=167 bgcolor=#E9E9E9
| 562167 ||  || — || September 26, 2006 || Catalina || CSS ||  || align=right | 1.5 km || 
|-id=168 bgcolor=#C2FFFF
| 562168 ||  || — || October 5, 2013 || Mount Lemmon || Mount Lemmon Survey || L5 || align=right | 6.5 km || 
|-id=169 bgcolor=#fefefe
| 562169 ||  || — || December 8, 2015 || Haleakala || Pan-STARRS || H || align=right data-sort-value="0.54" | 540 m || 
|-id=170 bgcolor=#fefefe
| 562170 ||  || — || November 19, 2008 || Mount Lemmon || Mount Lemmon Survey ||  || align=right data-sort-value="0.60" | 600 m || 
|-id=171 bgcolor=#fefefe
| 562171 ||  || — || May 28, 2014 || Mount Lemmon || Mount Lemmon Survey ||  || align=right data-sort-value="0.73" | 730 m || 
|-id=172 bgcolor=#E9E9E9
| 562172 ||  || — || November 22, 2015 || Mount Lemmon || Mount Lemmon Survey ||  || align=right data-sort-value="0.76" | 760 m || 
|-id=173 bgcolor=#E9E9E9
| 562173 ||  || — || April 6, 2013 || Haleakala || Pan-STARRS ||  || align=right | 1.3 km || 
|-id=174 bgcolor=#E9E9E9
| 562174 ||  || — || November 8, 2007 || Kitt Peak || Spacewatch ||  || align=right | 1.2 km || 
|-id=175 bgcolor=#E9E9E9
| 562175 ||  || — || April 5, 2005 || Mount Lemmon || Mount Lemmon Survey ||  || align=right | 1.1 km || 
|-id=176 bgcolor=#fefefe
| 562176 ||  || — || November 19, 2008 || Mount Lemmon || Mount Lemmon Survey ||  || align=right data-sort-value="0.83" | 830 m || 
|-id=177 bgcolor=#E9E9E9
| 562177 ||  || — || March 4, 2008 || Catalina || CSS ||  || align=right | 1.1 km || 
|-id=178 bgcolor=#fefefe
| 562178 ||  || — || December 30, 2008 || Mount Lemmon || Mount Lemmon Survey ||  || align=right data-sort-value="0.55" | 550 m || 
|-id=179 bgcolor=#E9E9E9
| 562179 ||  || — || January 12, 2008 || Kitt Peak || Spacewatch ||  || align=right data-sort-value="0.83" | 830 m || 
|-id=180 bgcolor=#fefefe
| 562180 ||  || — || October 23, 2004 || Kitt Peak || Spacewatch ||  || align=right data-sort-value="0.68" | 680 m || 
|-id=181 bgcolor=#fefefe
| 562181 ||  || — || September 25, 2011 || Haleakala || Pan-STARRS ||  || align=right data-sort-value="0.67" | 670 m || 
|-id=182 bgcolor=#E9E9E9
| 562182 ||  || — || December 26, 1998 || Kitt Peak || Spacewatch ||  || align=right | 1.4 km || 
|-id=183 bgcolor=#fefefe
| 562183 ||  || — || September 25, 2011 || Haleakala || Pan-STARRS ||  || align=right data-sort-value="0.72" | 720 m || 
|-id=184 bgcolor=#E9E9E9
| 562184 ||  || — || April 30, 2009 || Mount Lemmon || Mount Lemmon Survey ||  || align=right | 2.0 km || 
|-id=185 bgcolor=#fefefe
| 562185 ||  || — || October 11, 2007 || Catalina || CSS || NYS || align=right data-sort-value="0.62" | 620 m || 
|-id=186 bgcolor=#fefefe
| 562186 ||  || — || December 21, 2008 || Mount Lemmon || Mount Lemmon Survey ||  || align=right data-sort-value="0.67" | 670 m || 
|-id=187 bgcolor=#fefefe
| 562187 ||  || — || May 20, 2014 || Haleakala || Pan-STARRS ||  || align=right data-sort-value="0.66" | 660 m || 
|-id=188 bgcolor=#fefefe
| 562188 ||  || — || September 10, 2007 || Mount Lemmon || Mount Lemmon Survey ||  || align=right data-sort-value="0.67" | 670 m || 
|-id=189 bgcolor=#E9E9E9
| 562189 ||  || — || November 22, 2015 || Mount Lemmon || Mount Lemmon Survey ||  || align=right data-sort-value="0.66" | 660 m || 
|-id=190 bgcolor=#E9E9E9
| 562190 ||  || — || January 31, 2004 || Campo Imperatore || CINEOS ||  || align=right data-sort-value="0.94" | 940 m || 
|-id=191 bgcolor=#fefefe
| 562191 ||  || — || May 21, 2014 || Haleakala || Pan-STARRS ||  || align=right data-sort-value="0.60" | 600 m || 
|-id=192 bgcolor=#fefefe
| 562192 ||  || — || September 9, 2007 || Mount Lemmon || Mount Lemmon Survey ||  || align=right data-sort-value="0.78" | 780 m || 
|-id=193 bgcolor=#E9E9E9
| 562193 ||  || — || December 31, 2007 || Kitt Peak || Spacewatch ||  || align=right data-sort-value="0.97" | 970 m || 
|-id=194 bgcolor=#E9E9E9
| 562194 ||  || — || December 7, 2015 || Haleakala || Pan-STARRS ||  || align=right | 1.0 km || 
|-id=195 bgcolor=#fefefe
| 562195 ||  || — || October 16, 2015 || Mount Lemmon || Mount Lemmon Survey ||  || align=right data-sort-value="0.67" | 670 m || 
|-id=196 bgcolor=#fefefe
| 562196 ||  || — || November 7, 2008 || Mount Lemmon || Mount Lemmon Survey ||  || align=right | 1.0 km || 
|-id=197 bgcolor=#E9E9E9
| 562197 ||  || — || November 7, 2015 || Mount Lemmon || Mount Lemmon Survey ||  || align=right | 1.0 km || 
|-id=198 bgcolor=#fefefe
| 562198 ||  || — || September 26, 2011 || Haleakala || Pan-STARRS ||  || align=right data-sort-value="0.73" | 730 m || 
|-id=199 bgcolor=#E9E9E9
| 562199 ||  || — || November 11, 2007 || Mount Lemmon || Mount Lemmon Survey ||  || align=right data-sort-value="0.96" | 960 m || 
|-id=200 bgcolor=#fefefe
| 562200 ||  || — || November 12, 2001 || Apache Point || SDSS Collaboration ||  || align=right data-sort-value="0.64" | 640 m || 
|}

562201–562300 

|-bgcolor=#E9E9E9
| 562201 ||  || — || October 9, 2011 || Ka-Dar || V. Gerke ||  || align=right | 1.2 km || 
|-id=202 bgcolor=#E9E9E9
| 562202 ||  || — || May 31, 2014 || Haleakala || Pan-STARRS || EUN || align=right | 1.2 km || 
|-id=203 bgcolor=#E9E9E9
| 562203 ||  || — || November 27, 2006 || Mount Lemmon || Mount Lemmon Survey ||  || align=right | 1.9 km || 
|-id=204 bgcolor=#fefefe
| 562204 ||  || — || November 26, 2005 || Mount Lemmon || Mount Lemmon Survey ||  || align=right data-sort-value="0.54" | 540 m || 
|-id=205 bgcolor=#fefefe
| 562205 ||  || — || March 5, 2002 || Apache Point || SDSS Collaboration ||  || align=right data-sort-value="0.73" | 730 m || 
|-id=206 bgcolor=#E9E9E9
| 562206 ||  || — || September 27, 2002 || Palomar || NEAT || EUN || align=right | 1.4 km || 
|-id=207 bgcolor=#fefefe
| 562207 ||  || — || April 2, 2006 || Kitt Peak || Spacewatch ||  || align=right data-sort-value="0.58" | 580 m || 
|-id=208 bgcolor=#fefefe
| 562208 ||  || — || July 8, 2003 || Palomar || NEAT ||  || align=right data-sort-value="0.91" | 910 m || 
|-id=209 bgcolor=#E9E9E9
| 562209 ||  || — || March 13, 2008 || Kitt Peak || Spacewatch ||  || align=right | 1.1 km || 
|-id=210 bgcolor=#E9E9E9
| 562210 ||  || — || December 29, 2003 || Kitt Peak || Spacewatch ||  || align=right data-sort-value="0.99" | 990 m || 
|-id=211 bgcolor=#E9E9E9
| 562211 ||  || — || December 8, 2015 || Mount Lemmon || Mount Lemmon Survey ||  || align=right data-sort-value="0.84" | 840 m || 
|-id=212 bgcolor=#fefefe
| 562212 ||  || — || October 10, 2007 || Kitt Peak || Spacewatch ||  || align=right data-sort-value="0.67" | 670 m || 
|-id=213 bgcolor=#fefefe
| 562213 ||  || — || September 29, 2011 || Kitt Peak || Spacewatch ||  || align=right data-sort-value="0.73" | 730 m || 
|-id=214 bgcolor=#E9E9E9
| 562214 ||  || — || March 8, 2005 || Mount Lemmon || Mount Lemmon Survey ||  || align=right | 1.0 km || 
|-id=215 bgcolor=#E9E9E9
| 562215 ||  || — || February 10, 2007 || Mount Lemmon || Mount Lemmon Survey ||  || align=right | 1.6 km || 
|-id=216 bgcolor=#E9E9E9
| 562216 ||  || — || December 30, 2007 || Kitt Peak || Spacewatch ||  || align=right data-sort-value="0.83" | 830 m || 
|-id=217 bgcolor=#fefefe
| 562217 ||  || — || September 10, 2007 || Kitt Peak || Spacewatch ||  || align=right data-sort-value="0.65" | 650 m || 
|-id=218 bgcolor=#E9E9E9
| 562218 ||  || — || April 16, 2013 || Haleakala || Pan-STARRS ||  || align=right data-sort-value="0.84" | 840 m || 
|-id=219 bgcolor=#E9E9E9
| 562219 ||  || — || December 8, 2015 || Haleakala || Pan-STARRS ||  || align=right data-sort-value="0.64" | 640 m || 
|-id=220 bgcolor=#fefefe
| 562220 ||  || — || September 17, 2003 || Kitt Peak || Spacewatch ||  || align=right data-sort-value="0.72" | 720 m || 
|-id=221 bgcolor=#fefefe
| 562221 ||  || — || October 17, 2011 || Kitt Peak || Spacewatch ||  || align=right data-sort-value="0.62" | 620 m || 
|-id=222 bgcolor=#E9E9E9
| 562222 ||  || — || October 2, 2006 || Mount Lemmon || Mount Lemmon Survey ||  || align=right data-sort-value="0.97" | 970 m || 
|-id=223 bgcolor=#E9E9E9
| 562223 ||  || — || June 12, 2004 || Palomar || NEAT ||  || align=right | 2.8 km || 
|-id=224 bgcolor=#E9E9E9
| 562224 ||  || — || December 29, 2011 || Mount Lemmon || Mount Lemmon Survey ||  || align=right | 1.3 km || 
|-id=225 bgcolor=#E9E9E9
| 562225 ||  || — || November 29, 2003 || Kitt Peak || Spacewatch ||  || align=right data-sort-value="0.80" | 800 m || 
|-id=226 bgcolor=#E9E9E9
| 562226 ||  || — || January 26, 2012 || Mount Lemmon || Mount Lemmon Survey ||  || align=right data-sort-value="0.91" | 910 m || 
|-id=227 bgcolor=#fefefe
| 562227 ||  || — || June 21, 2010 || Mount Lemmon || Mount Lemmon Survey ||  || align=right data-sort-value="0.81" | 810 m || 
|-id=228 bgcolor=#E9E9E9
| 562228 ||  || — || January 11, 2008 || Kitt Peak || Spacewatch ||  || align=right data-sort-value="0.80" | 800 m || 
|-id=229 bgcolor=#E9E9E9
| 562229 ||  || — || March 31, 2004 || Kitt Peak || Spacewatch ||  || align=right | 1.2 km || 
|-id=230 bgcolor=#fefefe
| 562230 ||  || — || October 18, 2011 || Kitt Peak || Spacewatch ||  || align=right data-sort-value="0.77" | 770 m || 
|-id=231 bgcolor=#E9E9E9
| 562231 ||  || — || December 4, 2007 || Kitt Peak || Spacewatch ||  || align=right data-sort-value="0.90" | 900 m || 
|-id=232 bgcolor=#E9E9E9
| 562232 ||  || — || December 25, 2011 || Mount Lemmon || Mount Lemmon Survey ||  || align=right data-sort-value="0.76" | 760 m || 
|-id=233 bgcolor=#fefefe
| 562233 ||  || — || September 12, 2007 || Kitt Peak || Spacewatch ||  || align=right data-sort-value="0.67" | 670 m || 
|-id=234 bgcolor=#E9E9E9
| 562234 ||  || — || July 8, 2014 || Haleakala || Pan-STARRS ||  || align=right | 1.1 km || 
|-id=235 bgcolor=#fefefe
| 562235 ||  || — || September 29, 2011 || Kitt Peak || Spacewatch ||  || align=right data-sort-value="0.65" | 650 m || 
|-id=236 bgcolor=#E9E9E9
| 562236 ||  || — || December 3, 2007 || Kitt Peak || Spacewatch ||  || align=right data-sort-value="0.73" | 730 m || 
|-id=237 bgcolor=#E9E9E9
| 562237 ||  || — || November 22, 2011 || Zelenchukskaya Stn || T. V. Kryachko, B. Satovski ||  || align=right data-sort-value="0.93" | 930 m || 
|-id=238 bgcolor=#fefefe
| 562238 ||  || — || April 11, 2005 || Kitt Peak || Mount Lemmon Survey ||  || align=right data-sort-value="0.71" | 710 m || 
|-id=239 bgcolor=#E9E9E9
| 562239 ||  || — || February 11, 2000 || La Silla || C. Cavadore, F. Colas || (5) || align=right data-sort-value="0.59" | 590 m || 
|-id=240 bgcolor=#E9E9E9
| 562240 ||  || — || September 17, 2006 || Kitt Peak || Spacewatch ||  || align=right data-sort-value="0.89" | 890 m || 
|-id=241 bgcolor=#E9E9E9
| 562241 ||  || — || December 20, 2011 || ESA OGS || ESA OGS ||  || align=right | 1.0 km || 
|-id=242 bgcolor=#E9E9E9
| 562242 ||  || — || March 16, 2013 || Kitt Peak || Spacewatch ||  || align=right data-sort-value="0.75" | 750 m || 
|-id=243 bgcolor=#E9E9E9
| 562243 ||  || — || November 25, 2011 || Haleakala || Pan-STARRS ||  || align=right | 1.5 km || 
|-id=244 bgcolor=#fefefe
| 562244 ||  || — || December 22, 2008 || Mount Lemmon || Mount Lemmon Survey ||  || align=right data-sort-value="0.64" | 640 m || 
|-id=245 bgcolor=#fefefe
| 562245 ||  || — || October 24, 2011 || Catalina || CSS ||  || align=right data-sort-value="0.84" | 840 m || 
|-id=246 bgcolor=#E9E9E9
| 562246 ||  || — || March 16, 2012 || Haleakala || Pan-STARRS ||  || align=right | 2.2 km || 
|-id=247 bgcolor=#E9E9E9
| 562247 ||  || — || January 13, 1996 || Kitt Peak || Spacewatch ||  || align=right | 1.2 km || 
|-id=248 bgcolor=#E9E9E9
| 562248 ||  || — || November 17, 2015 || Haleakala || Pan-STARRS ||  || align=right data-sort-value="0.78" | 780 m || 
|-id=249 bgcolor=#E9E9E9
| 562249 ||  || — || December 21, 2003 || Kitt Peak || Spacewatch ||  || align=right data-sort-value="0.63" | 630 m || 
|-id=250 bgcolor=#E9E9E9
| 562250 ||  || — || October 8, 2015 || Haleakala || Pan-STARRS ||  || align=right data-sort-value="0.75" | 750 m || 
|-id=251 bgcolor=#E9E9E9
| 562251 ||  || — || April 12, 2008 || Mount Lemmon || Mount Lemmon Survey ||  || align=right | 1.1 km || 
|-id=252 bgcolor=#E9E9E9
| 562252 ||  || — || February 24, 2012 || Mount Lemmon || Mount Lemmon Survey ||  || align=right | 1.5 km || 
|-id=253 bgcolor=#fefefe
| 562253 ||  || — || January 17, 2013 || Haleakala || Pan-STARRS ||  || align=right data-sort-value="0.67" | 670 m || 
|-id=254 bgcolor=#E9E9E9
| 562254 ||  || — || April 13, 1996 || Kitt Peak || Spacewatch ||  || align=right | 1.7 km || 
|-id=255 bgcolor=#E9E9E9
| 562255 ||  || — || December 8, 2015 || Mount Lemmon || Mount Lemmon Survey ||  || align=right | 1.1 km || 
|-id=256 bgcolor=#E9E9E9
| 562256 ||  || — || June 28, 2014 || Haleakala || Pan-STARRS ||  || align=right data-sort-value="0.85" | 850 m || 
|-id=257 bgcolor=#E9E9E9
| 562257 ||  || — || January 21, 2012 || Mayhill-ISON || L. Elenin ||  || align=right | 1.4 km || 
|-id=258 bgcolor=#E9E9E9
| 562258 ||  || — || January 25, 2012 || Haleakala || Pan-STARRS ||  || align=right | 2.0 km || 
|-id=259 bgcolor=#E9E9E9
| 562259 ||  || — || January 20, 2008 || Kitt Peak || Spacewatch ||  || align=right data-sort-value="0.84" | 840 m || 
|-id=260 bgcolor=#E9E9E9
| 562260 ||  || — || November 17, 2007 || Mount Lemmon || Mount Lemmon Survey ||  || align=right data-sort-value="0.64" | 640 m || 
|-id=261 bgcolor=#E9E9E9
| 562261 ||  || — || March 29, 2008 || Kitt Peak || Spacewatch ||  || align=right | 2.2 km || 
|-id=262 bgcolor=#E9E9E9
| 562262 ||  || — || December 5, 2007 || Kitt Peak || Spacewatch ||  || align=right | 1.2 km || 
|-id=263 bgcolor=#E9E9E9
| 562263 ||  || — || June 30, 2014 || Haleakala || Pan-STARRS ||  || align=right | 1.8 km || 
|-id=264 bgcolor=#E9E9E9
| 562264 ||  || — || August 28, 2014 || Haleakala || Pan-STARRS ||  || align=right data-sort-value="0.83" | 830 m || 
|-id=265 bgcolor=#fefefe
| 562265 ||  || — || August 24, 2011 || La Sagra || OAM Obs. ||  || align=right data-sort-value="0.75" | 750 m || 
|-id=266 bgcolor=#E9E9E9
| 562266 ||  || — || December 8, 2015 || Mount Lemmon || Mount Lemmon Survey ||  || align=right | 1.7 km || 
|-id=267 bgcolor=#E9E9E9
| 562267 ||  || — || January 21, 2012 || Kitt Peak || Spacewatch ||  || align=right | 1.2 km || 
|-id=268 bgcolor=#fefefe
| 562268 ||  || — || December 12, 2015 || Haleakala || Pan-STARRS ||  || align=right data-sort-value="0.91" | 910 m || 
|-id=269 bgcolor=#E9E9E9
| 562269 ||  || — || August 23, 2014 || Haleakala || Pan-STARRS ||  || align=right | 1.7 km || 
|-id=270 bgcolor=#fefefe
| 562270 ||  || — || November 6, 2008 || Mount Lemmon || Mount Lemmon Survey ||  || align=right data-sort-value="0.71" | 710 m || 
|-id=271 bgcolor=#E9E9E9
| 562271 ||  || — || December 18, 2007 || Kitt Peak || Spacewatch ||  || align=right data-sort-value="0.90" | 900 m || 
|-id=272 bgcolor=#E9E9E9
| 562272 ||  || — || January 21, 2012 || Mayhill-ISON || L. Elenin ||  || align=right | 1.3 km || 
|-id=273 bgcolor=#E9E9E9
| 562273 ||  || — || September 17, 2011 || Haleakala || Pan-STARRS ||  || align=right | 1.3 km || 
|-id=274 bgcolor=#C7FF8F
| 562274 ||  || — || December 8, 2015 || Calar Alto-CASADO || S. Hellmich, S. Mottola || centaur || align=right | 180 km || 
|-id=275 bgcolor=#fefefe
| 562275 ||  || — || September 24, 2011 || Haleakala || Pan-STARRS ||  || align=right data-sort-value="0.80" | 800 m || 
|-id=276 bgcolor=#d6d6d6
| 562276 ||  || — || December 8, 2010 || Kitt Peak || Spacewatch ||  || align=right | 2.4 km || 
|-id=277 bgcolor=#E9E9E9
| 562277 ||  || — || November 28, 2011 || Haleakala || Pan-STARRS ||  || align=right data-sort-value="0.89" | 890 m || 
|-id=278 bgcolor=#E9E9E9
| 562278 ||  || — || March 10, 2005 || Mount Lemmon || Mount Lemmon Survey ||  || align=right | 1.0 km || 
|-id=279 bgcolor=#E9E9E9
| 562279 ||  || — || March 2, 2009 || Mount Lemmon || Mount Lemmon Survey || MAR || align=right | 1.1 km || 
|-id=280 bgcolor=#E9E9E9
| 562280 ||  || — || July 19, 2009 || La Sagra || OAM Obs. ||  || align=right | 1.9 km || 
|-id=281 bgcolor=#E9E9E9
| 562281 ||  || — || January 22, 1993 || Kitt Peak || Spacewatch ||  || align=right | 1.7 km || 
|-id=282 bgcolor=#E9E9E9
| 562282 ||  || — || March 16, 2004 || Catalina || CSS ||  || align=right | 1.4 km || 
|-id=283 bgcolor=#E9E9E9
| 562283 ||  || — || June 18, 2005 || Mount Lemmon || Mount Lemmon Survey ||  || align=right | 2.4 km || 
|-id=284 bgcolor=#E9E9E9
| 562284 ||  || — || August 25, 2014 || Haleakala || Pan-STARRS ||  || align=right | 1.5 km || 
|-id=285 bgcolor=#E9E9E9
| 562285 ||  || — || December 15, 2015 || XuYi || PMO NEO ||  || align=right | 1.9 km || 
|-id=286 bgcolor=#E9E9E9
| 562286 ||  || — || May 12, 2008 || Siding Spring || SSS ||  || align=right | 1.4 km || 
|-id=287 bgcolor=#fefefe
| 562287 ||  || — || August 23, 2003 || Palomar || NEAT ||  || align=right data-sort-value="0.92" | 920 m || 
|-id=288 bgcolor=#E9E9E9
| 562288 ||  || — || December 9, 2015 || Haleakala || Pan-STARRS ||  || align=right data-sort-value="0.97" | 970 m || 
|-id=289 bgcolor=#E9E9E9
| 562289 ||  || — || May 20, 2005 || Mount Lemmon || Mount Lemmon Survey ||  || align=right data-sort-value="0.97" | 970 m || 
|-id=290 bgcolor=#E9E9E9
| 562290 ||  || — || October 9, 2010 || Mount Lemmon || Mount Lemmon Survey ||  || align=right | 1.7 km || 
|-id=291 bgcolor=#E9E9E9
| 562291 ||  || — || April 13, 2008 || Mount Lemmon || Mount Lemmon Survey ||  || align=right | 1.5 km || 
|-id=292 bgcolor=#E9E9E9
| 562292 ||  || — || October 2, 2014 || Haleakala || Pan-STARRS ||  || align=right | 1.3 km || 
|-id=293 bgcolor=#E9E9E9
| 562293 ||  || — || November 6, 2010 || Mount Lemmon || Mount Lemmon Survey ||  || align=right | 1.9 km || 
|-id=294 bgcolor=#E9E9E9
| 562294 ||  || — || December 9, 2015 || Haleakala || Pan-STARRS ||  || align=right | 1.7 km || 
|-id=295 bgcolor=#d6d6d6
| 562295 ||  || — || October 1, 2014 || Haleakala || Pan-STARRS ||  || align=right | 2.8 km || 
|-id=296 bgcolor=#E9E9E9
| 562296 ||  || — || January 19, 2012 || Catalina || CSS ||  || align=right | 1.2 km || 
|-id=297 bgcolor=#d6d6d6
| 562297 ||  || — || January 27, 2007 || Mount Lemmon || Mount Lemmon Survey ||  || align=right | 2.3 km || 
|-id=298 bgcolor=#E9E9E9
| 562298 ||  || — || January 22, 2012 || Haleakala || Pan-STARRS ||  || align=right | 1.1 km || 
|-id=299 bgcolor=#E9E9E9
| 562299 ||  || — || January 3, 2012 || Mount Lemmon || Mount Lemmon Survey ||  || align=right | 1.3 km || 
|-id=300 bgcolor=#E9E9E9
| 562300 ||  || — || December 8, 2015 || Mount Lemmon || Mount Lemmon Survey ||  || align=right | 1.2 km || 
|}

562301–562400 

|-bgcolor=#E9E9E9
| 562301 ||  || — || August 18, 2009 || Kitt Peak || Spacewatch ||  || align=right | 2.1 km || 
|-id=302 bgcolor=#E9E9E9
| 562302 ||  || — || December 14, 2010 || ESA OGS || ESA OGS ||  || align=right | 2.0 km || 
|-id=303 bgcolor=#E9E9E9
| 562303 ||  || — || October 14, 2014 || Mount Lemmon || Mount Lemmon Survey ||  || align=right data-sort-value="0.87" | 870 m || 
|-id=304 bgcolor=#E9E9E9
| 562304 ||  || — || October 28, 2006 || Mount Lemmon || Mount Lemmon Survey ||  || align=right | 1.0 km || 
|-id=305 bgcolor=#E9E9E9
| 562305 ||  || — || October 28, 2006 || Catalina || CSS ||  || align=right | 2.0 km || 
|-id=306 bgcolor=#d6d6d6
| 562306 ||  || — || September 20, 2014 || Haleakala || Pan-STARRS ||  || align=right | 2.0 km || 
|-id=307 bgcolor=#E9E9E9
| 562307 ||  || — || April 19, 2007 || Mount Lemmon || Mount Lemmon Survey ||  || align=right | 1.9 km || 
|-id=308 bgcolor=#E9E9E9
| 562308 ||  || — || January 15, 2008 || Mount Lemmon || Mount Lemmon Survey ||  || align=right data-sort-value="0.84" | 840 m || 
|-id=309 bgcolor=#E9E9E9
| 562309 ||  || — || December 29, 2011 || Mount Lemmon || Mount Lemmon Survey ||  || align=right data-sort-value="0.87" | 870 m || 
|-id=310 bgcolor=#E9E9E9
| 562310 ||  || — || February 23, 2007 || Mount Lemmon || Mount Lemmon Survey ||  || align=right | 2.3 km || 
|-id=311 bgcolor=#E9E9E9
| 562311 ||  || — || April 27, 2012 || Mount Lemmon || Mount Lemmon Survey ||  || align=right | 1.9 km || 
|-id=312 bgcolor=#E9E9E9
| 562312 ||  || — || September 19, 2014 || Haleakala || Pan-STARRS ||  || align=right | 1.2 km || 
|-id=313 bgcolor=#E9E9E9
| 562313 ||  || — || August 13, 2002 || Kitt Peak || Spacewatch ||  || align=right | 1.00 km || 
|-id=314 bgcolor=#E9E9E9
| 562314 ||  || — || December 9, 2015 || Haleakala || Pan-STARRS ||  || align=right | 1.5 km || 
|-id=315 bgcolor=#d6d6d6
| 562315 ||  || — || September 27, 2009 || Mount Lemmon || Mount Lemmon Survey ||  || align=right | 2.2 km || 
|-id=316 bgcolor=#E9E9E9
| 562316 ||  || — || March 16, 2012 || Mount Lemmon || Mount Lemmon Survey ||  || align=right | 1.3 km || 
|-id=317 bgcolor=#E9E9E9
| 562317 ||  || — || October 31, 2010 || Mount Lemmon || Mount Lemmon Survey ||  || align=right | 1.3 km || 
|-id=318 bgcolor=#E9E9E9
| 562318 ||  || — || December 13, 2015 || Haleakala || Pan-STARRS ||  || align=right | 1.6 km || 
|-id=319 bgcolor=#E9E9E9
| 562319 ||  || — || November 26, 2003 || Kitt Peak || Spacewatch ||  || align=right data-sort-value="0.88" | 880 m || 
|-id=320 bgcolor=#E9E9E9
| 562320 ||  || — || December 29, 2003 || Kitt Peak || Spacewatch ||  || align=right data-sort-value="0.95" | 950 m || 
|-id=321 bgcolor=#E9E9E9
| 562321 ||  || — || February 23, 2012 || Mount Lemmon || Mount Lemmon Survey ||  || align=right | 1.9 km || 
|-id=322 bgcolor=#E9E9E9
| 562322 ||  || — || April 11, 2003 || Kitt Peak || Spacewatch ||  || align=right | 2.2 km || 
|-id=323 bgcolor=#E9E9E9
| 562323 ||  || — || December 27, 2006 || Mount Lemmon || Mount Lemmon Survey ||  || align=right | 1.4 km || 
|-id=324 bgcolor=#fefefe
| 562324 ||  || — || August 20, 2014 || Haleakala || Pan-STARRS ||  || align=right data-sort-value="0.75" | 750 m || 
|-id=325 bgcolor=#E9E9E9
| 562325 ||  || — || September 26, 2009 || Kitt Peak || Spacewatch ||  || align=right | 1.4 km || 
|-id=326 bgcolor=#E9E9E9
| 562326 ||  || — || February 10, 2007 || Catalina || CSS ||  || align=right | 1.9 km || 
|-id=327 bgcolor=#E9E9E9
| 562327 ||  || — || July 4, 2014 || Haleakala || Pan-STARRS ||  || align=right | 1.4 km || 
|-id=328 bgcolor=#fefefe
| 562328 ||  || — || November 2, 2007 || Mount Lemmon || Mount Lemmon Survey ||  || align=right data-sort-value="0.76" | 760 m || 
|-id=329 bgcolor=#E9E9E9
| 562329 ||  || — || January 19, 2012 || Haleakala || Pan-STARRS ||  || align=right data-sort-value="0.94" | 940 m || 
|-id=330 bgcolor=#E9E9E9
| 562330 ||  || — || September 2, 2010 || Mount Lemmon || Mount Lemmon Survey ||  || align=right data-sort-value="0.74" | 740 m || 
|-id=331 bgcolor=#E9E9E9
| 562331 ||  || — || May 10, 2013 || Haleakala || Pan-STARRS ||  || align=right | 1.3 km || 
|-id=332 bgcolor=#E9E9E9
| 562332 ||  || — || March 3, 2003 || Palomar || NEAT ||  || align=right | 1.9 km || 
|-id=333 bgcolor=#E9E9E9
| 562333 ||  || — || December 3, 2015 || Mount Lemmon || Mount Lemmon Survey ||  || align=right | 1.2 km || 
|-id=334 bgcolor=#E9E9E9
| 562334 ||  || — || August 28, 2014 || Haleakala || Pan-STARRS ||  || align=right | 1.8 km || 
|-id=335 bgcolor=#E9E9E9
| 562335 ||  || — || September 5, 2010 || Mount Lemmon || Mount Lemmon Survey ||  || align=right | 2.0 km || 
|-id=336 bgcolor=#E9E9E9
| 562336 ||  || — || February 22, 2012 || Kitt Peak || Spacewatch ||  || align=right | 1.4 km || 
|-id=337 bgcolor=#E9E9E9
| 562337 ||  || — || February 2, 2008 || Kitt Peak || Spacewatch ||  || align=right | 1.1 km || 
|-id=338 bgcolor=#E9E9E9
| 562338 ||  || — || December 4, 2015 || Mount Lemmon || Mount Lemmon Survey ||  || align=right data-sort-value="0.86" | 860 m || 
|-id=339 bgcolor=#d6d6d6
| 562339 ||  || — || September 23, 2014 || Mount Lemmon || Mount Lemmon Survey ||  || align=right | 2.0 km || 
|-id=340 bgcolor=#E9E9E9
| 562340 ||  || — || May 12, 2013 || Haleakala || Pan-STARRS ||  || align=right | 1.2 km || 
|-id=341 bgcolor=#E9E9E9
| 562341 ||  || — || December 4, 2015 || Haleakala || Pan-STARRS ||  || align=right | 1.2 km || 
|-id=342 bgcolor=#E9E9E9
| 562342 ||  || — || April 1, 2013 || Kitt Peak || Spacewatch ||  || align=right data-sort-value="0.97" | 970 m || 
|-id=343 bgcolor=#E9E9E9
| 562343 ||  || — || August 29, 2005 || Kitt Peak || Spacewatch ||  || align=right | 1.8 km || 
|-id=344 bgcolor=#E9E9E9
| 562344 ||  || — || September 1, 2010 || Mount Lemmon || Mount Lemmon Survey ||  || align=right | 1.3 km || 
|-id=345 bgcolor=#E9E9E9
| 562345 ||  || — || September 5, 2010 || Mount Lemmon || Mount Lemmon Survey ||  || align=right | 1.4 km || 
|-id=346 bgcolor=#E9E9E9
| 562346 ||  || — || July 1, 2014 || Haleakala || Pan-STARRS ||  || align=right data-sort-value="0.94" | 940 m || 
|-id=347 bgcolor=#E9E9E9
| 562347 ||  || — || December 3, 2007 || Kitt Peak || Spacewatch ||  || align=right data-sort-value="0.81" | 810 m || 
|-id=348 bgcolor=#E9E9E9
| 562348 ||  || — || August 28, 2014 || Haleakala || Pan-STARRS ||  || align=right | 1.3 km || 
|-id=349 bgcolor=#E9E9E9
| 562349 ||  || — || November 8, 2010 || Kitt Peak || Spacewatch ||  || align=right | 1.8 km || 
|-id=350 bgcolor=#E9E9E9
| 562350 ||  || — || May 5, 2013 || Mount Lemmon || Mount Lemmon Survey ||  || align=right | 1.3 km || 
|-id=351 bgcolor=#E9E9E9
| 562351 ||  || — || November 8, 2010 || Mount Lemmon || Mount Lemmon Survey ||  || align=right | 1.5 km || 
|-id=352 bgcolor=#E9E9E9
| 562352 ||  || — || January 31, 2004 || Apache Point || SDSS Collaboration ||  || align=right | 1.1 km || 
|-id=353 bgcolor=#E9E9E9
| 562353 ||  || — || October 2, 2014 || Haleakala || Pan-STARRS ||  || align=right | 1.3 km || 
|-id=354 bgcolor=#E9E9E9
| 562354 ||  || — || November 12, 2005 || Kitt Peak || Spacewatch ||  || align=right | 2.1 km || 
|-id=355 bgcolor=#E9E9E9
| 562355 ||  || — || December 31, 2011 || Mount Lemmon || Mount Lemmon Survey ||  || align=right | 1.3 km || 
|-id=356 bgcolor=#E9E9E9
| 562356 ||  || — || December 6, 2007 || Palomar || Spacewatch ||  || align=right | 1.0 km || 
|-id=357 bgcolor=#E9E9E9
| 562357 ||  || — || December 8, 2015 || Haleakala || Pan-STARRS ||  || align=right data-sort-value="0.83" | 830 m || 
|-id=358 bgcolor=#E9E9E9
| 562358 ||  || — || June 7, 2013 || Haleakala || Pan-STARRS ||  || align=right data-sort-value="0.72" | 720 m || 
|-id=359 bgcolor=#E9E9E9
| 562359 ||  || — || June 2, 2014 || Haleakala || Pan-STARRS ||  || align=right | 1.0 km || 
|-id=360 bgcolor=#E9E9E9
| 562360 ||  || — || January 19, 2012 || Haleakala || Pan-STARRS ||  || align=right | 1.3 km || 
|-id=361 bgcolor=#E9E9E9
| 562361 ||  || — || September 19, 2014 || Haleakala || Pan-STARRS ||  || align=right | 1.8 km || 
|-id=362 bgcolor=#E9E9E9
| 562362 ||  || — || December 8, 2015 || Haleakala || Pan-STARRS ||  || align=right data-sort-value="0.90" | 900 m || 
|-id=363 bgcolor=#E9E9E9
| 562363 ||  || — || December 17, 2007 || Mount Lemmon || Mount Lemmon Survey ||  || align=right data-sort-value="0.80" | 800 m || 
|-id=364 bgcolor=#fefefe
| 562364 ||  || — || January 28, 2009 || Catalina || CSS ||  || align=right data-sort-value="0.94" | 940 m || 
|-id=365 bgcolor=#E9E9E9
| 562365 ||  || — || November 23, 2011 || Kitt Peak || Spacewatch ||  || align=right | 1.0 km || 
|-id=366 bgcolor=#E9E9E9
| 562366 ||  || — || February 1, 2003 || Palomar || NEAT ||  || align=right | 1.9 km || 
|-id=367 bgcolor=#E9E9E9
| 562367 ||  || — || July 15, 2013 || Haleakala || Pan-STARRS ||  || align=right | 1.8 km || 
|-id=368 bgcolor=#E9E9E9
| 562368 ||  || — || July 31, 2014 || Haleakala || Pan-STARRS ||  || align=right data-sort-value="0.95" | 950 m || 
|-id=369 bgcolor=#E9E9E9
| 562369 ||  || — || March 30, 2012 || Kitt Peak || Spacewatch ||  || align=right | 2.1 km || 
|-id=370 bgcolor=#E9E9E9
| 562370 ||  || — || December 12, 2015 || Haleakala || Pan-STARRS ||  || align=right | 1.8 km || 
|-id=371 bgcolor=#E9E9E9
| 562371 ||  || — || January 20, 2012 || Haleakala || Pan-STARRS ||  || align=right | 2.3 km || 
|-id=372 bgcolor=#E9E9E9
| 562372 ||  || — || February 10, 2007 || Mount Lemmon || Mount Lemmon Survey ||  || align=right | 2.0 km || 
|-id=373 bgcolor=#E9E9E9
| 562373 ||  || — || October 2, 2014 || Mount Lemmon || Mount Lemmon Survey ||  || align=right | 1.8 km || 
|-id=374 bgcolor=#E9E9E9
| 562374 ||  || — || November 11, 2006 || Kitt Peak || Spacewatch ||  || align=right data-sort-value="0.88" | 880 m || 
|-id=375 bgcolor=#E9E9E9
| 562375 ||  || — || November 6, 2005 || Kitt Peak || Spacewatch ||  || align=right | 2.4 km || 
|-id=376 bgcolor=#d6d6d6
| 562376 ||  || — || September 27, 2003 || Kitt Peak || Spacewatch ||  || align=right | 2.3 km || 
|-id=377 bgcolor=#E9E9E9
| 562377 ||  || — || October 25, 2005 || Kitt Peak || Spacewatch ||  || align=right | 1.8 km || 
|-id=378 bgcolor=#E9E9E9
| 562378 ||  || — || April 11, 2013 || Kitt Peak || Spacewatch ||  || align=right data-sort-value="0.88" | 880 m || 
|-id=379 bgcolor=#E9E9E9
| 562379 ||  || — || January 20, 2012 || Mount Lemmon || Mount Lemmon Survey ||  || align=right data-sort-value="0.83" | 830 m || 
|-id=380 bgcolor=#E9E9E9
| 562380 ||  || — || December 14, 2015 || Mount Lemmon || Mount Lemmon Survey ||  || align=right | 1.6 km || 
|-id=381 bgcolor=#E9E9E9
| 562381 ||  || — || November 20, 2006 || Kitt Peak || Spacewatch ||  || align=right | 1.2 km || 
|-id=382 bgcolor=#E9E9E9
| 562382 ||  || — || November 19, 2006 || Catalina || CSS ||  || align=right | 1.6 km || 
|-id=383 bgcolor=#E9E9E9
| 562383 ||  || — || July 25, 2014 || Haleakala || Pan-STARRS ||  || align=right data-sort-value="0.68" | 680 m || 
|-id=384 bgcolor=#E9E9E9
| 562384 ||  || — || December 14, 2015 || Haleakala || Pan-STARRS ||  || align=right | 1.5 km || 
|-id=385 bgcolor=#E9E9E9
| 562385 ||  || — || December 4, 2007 || Mount Lemmon || Mount Lemmon Survey ||  || align=right data-sort-value="0.79" | 790 m || 
|-id=386 bgcolor=#E9E9E9
| 562386 ||  || — || December 4, 2015 || Haleakala || Pan-STARRS ||  || align=right | 2.6 km || 
|-id=387 bgcolor=#E9E9E9
| 562387 ||  || — || November 2, 2015 || Mount Lemmon || Mount Lemmon Survey ||  || align=right | 1.4 km || 
|-id=388 bgcolor=#E9E9E9
| 562388 ||  || — || December 13, 2015 || Haleakala || Pan-STARRS ||  || align=right | 1.3 km || 
|-id=389 bgcolor=#E9E9E9
| 562389 ||  || — || December 8, 2015 || Haleakala || Pan-STARRS ||  || align=right data-sort-value="0.82" | 820 m || 
|-id=390 bgcolor=#E9E9E9
| 562390 ||  || — || December 10, 2015 || Anderson Mesa || Mount Lemmon Survey ||  || align=right | 1.1 km || 
|-id=391 bgcolor=#E9E9E9
| 562391 ||  || — || December 7, 2015 || Haleakala || Pan-STARRS ||  || align=right data-sort-value="0.70" | 700 m || 
|-id=392 bgcolor=#E9E9E9
| 562392 ||  || — || December 7, 2015 || Haleakala || Pan-STARRS ||  || align=right | 1.5 km || 
|-id=393 bgcolor=#fefefe
| 562393 ||  || — || December 8, 2015 || Haleakala || Pan-STARRS ||  || align=right data-sort-value="0.60" | 600 m || 
|-id=394 bgcolor=#fefefe
| 562394 ||  || — || June 28, 2014 || Haleakala || Pan-STARRS ||  || align=right data-sort-value="0.65" | 650 m || 
|-id=395 bgcolor=#d6d6d6
| 562395 ||  || — || December 14, 2015 || Haleakala || Pan-STARRS ||  || align=right | 2.9 km || 
|-id=396 bgcolor=#d6d6d6
| 562396 ||  || — || September 21, 2009 || Mount Lemmon || Mount Lemmon Survey ||  || align=right | 2.5 km || 
|-id=397 bgcolor=#d6d6d6
| 562397 ||  || — || December 9, 2015 || Mount Lemmon || Mount Lemmon Survey ||  || align=right | 1.9 km || 
|-id=398 bgcolor=#E9E9E9
| 562398 ||  || — || December 9, 2015 || Mount Lemmon || Mount Lemmon Survey ||  || align=right | 1.3 km || 
|-id=399 bgcolor=#d6d6d6
| 562399 ||  || — || December 13, 2015 || Haleakala || Pan-STARRS ||  || align=right | 2.3 km || 
|-id=400 bgcolor=#E9E9E9
| 562400 ||  || — || August 27, 2014 || Haleakala || Pan-STARRS ||  || align=right | 1.8 km || 
|}

562401–562500 

|-bgcolor=#E9E9E9
| 562401 ||  || — || October 23, 2006 || Catalina || CSS ||  || align=right | 1.8 km || 
|-id=402 bgcolor=#fefefe
| 562402 ||  || — || September 19, 2015 || Haleakala || Pan-STARRS ||  || align=right data-sort-value="0.85" | 850 m || 
|-id=403 bgcolor=#E9E9E9
| 562403 ||  || — || December 16, 2015 || Mount Lemmon || Mount Lemmon Survey ||  || align=right | 1.5 km || 
|-id=404 bgcolor=#E9E9E9
| 562404 ||  || — || February 25, 2012 || Catalina || CSS ||  || align=right | 1.5 km || 
|-id=405 bgcolor=#E9E9E9
| 562405 ||  || — || December 18, 2001 || Socorro || LINEAR ||  || align=right | 1.8 km || 
|-id=406 bgcolor=#E9E9E9
| 562406 ||  || — || November 28, 2002 || Haleakala || AMOS ||  || align=right | 1.4 km || 
|-id=407 bgcolor=#E9E9E9
| 562407 ||  || — || December 9, 2015 || Haleakala || Pan-STARRS ||  || align=right | 1.5 km || 
|-id=408 bgcolor=#E9E9E9
| 562408 ||  || — || October 29, 2006 || Catalina || CSS ||  || align=right | 1.6 km || 
|-id=409 bgcolor=#E9E9E9
| 562409 ||  || — || March 12, 2008 || Mount Lemmon || Mount Lemmon Survey ||  || align=right | 1.2 km || 
|-id=410 bgcolor=#E9E9E9
| 562410 ||  || — || September 19, 2006 || Catalina || CSS ||  || align=right | 1.9 km || 
|-id=411 bgcolor=#E9E9E9
| 562411 ||  || — || December 13, 2006 || Kitt Peak || Spacewatch ||  || align=right | 1.4 km || 
|-id=412 bgcolor=#E9E9E9
| 562412 ||  || — || July 28, 2014 || Haleakala || Pan-STARRS ||  || align=right data-sort-value="0.78" | 780 m || 
|-id=413 bgcolor=#E9E9E9
| 562413 ||  || — || September 25, 2014 || Charleston || R. Holmes ||  || align=right | 1.6 km || 
|-id=414 bgcolor=#E9E9E9
| 562414 ||  || — || July 25, 2014 || Haleakala || Pan-STARRS ||  || align=right data-sort-value="0.99" | 990 m || 
|-id=415 bgcolor=#E9E9E9
| 562415 ||  || — || January 29, 2012 || Mount Lemmon || Mount Lemmon Survey ||  || align=right | 1.1 km || 
|-id=416 bgcolor=#E9E9E9
| 562416 ||  || — || January 23, 2012 || Catalina || CSS ||  || align=right | 1.1 km || 
|-id=417 bgcolor=#E9E9E9
| 562417 ||  || — || February 18, 2008 || Mount Lemmon || Mount Lemmon Survey ||  || align=right | 1.9 km || 
|-id=418 bgcolor=#fefefe
| 562418 ||  || — || September 15, 2007 || Mount Lemmon || Mount Lemmon Survey ||  || align=right data-sort-value="0.94" | 940 m || 
|-id=419 bgcolor=#E9E9E9
| 562419 ||  || — || May 30, 2014 || Haleakala || Pan-STARRS ||  || align=right data-sort-value="0.91" | 910 m || 
|-id=420 bgcolor=#E9E9E9
| 562420 ||  || — || August 29, 2006 || Kitt Peak || Spacewatch ||  || align=right data-sort-value="0.95" | 950 m || 
|-id=421 bgcolor=#E9E9E9
| 562421 ||  || — || December 30, 2008 || Mount Lemmon || Mount Lemmon Survey ||  || align=right | 1.3 km || 
|-id=422 bgcolor=#E9E9E9
| 562422 ||  || — || March 21, 2017 || Haleakala || Pan-STARRS ||  || align=right | 1.3 km || 
|-id=423 bgcolor=#E9E9E9
| 562423 ||  || — || March 13, 2004 || Palomar || NEAT ||  || align=right data-sort-value="0.88" | 880 m || 
|-id=424 bgcolor=#E9E9E9
| 562424 ||  || — || February 12, 2012 || Mount Lemmon || Mount Lemmon Survey ||  || align=right | 1.2 km || 
|-id=425 bgcolor=#E9E9E9
| 562425 ||  || — || June 1, 2013 || Mount Lemmon || Mount Lemmon Survey ||  || align=right | 1.1 km || 
|-id=426 bgcolor=#E9E9E9
| 562426 ||  || — || November 17, 2006 || Kitt Peak || Spacewatch ||  || align=right | 1.2 km || 
|-id=427 bgcolor=#E9E9E9
| 562427 ||  || — || December 3, 2015 || Haleakala || Pan-STARRS ||  || align=right | 1.2 km || 
|-id=428 bgcolor=#E9E9E9
| 562428 ||  || — || February 1, 2012 || Catalina || CSS ||  || align=right | 1.2 km || 
|-id=429 bgcolor=#E9E9E9
| 562429 ||  || — || July 4, 2014 || Haleakala || Pan-STARRS ||  || align=right data-sort-value="0.96" | 960 m || 
|-id=430 bgcolor=#E9E9E9
| 562430 ||  || — || December 5, 2015 || Haleakala || Pan-STARRS ||  || align=right | 1.0 km || 
|-id=431 bgcolor=#E9E9E9
| 562431 ||  || — || December 4, 2015 || Mount Lemmon || Mount Lemmon Survey ||  || align=right | 2.0 km || 
|-id=432 bgcolor=#E9E9E9
| 562432 ||  || — || October 1, 2014 || Haleakala || Pan-STARRS ||  || align=right data-sort-value="0.99" | 990 m || 
|-id=433 bgcolor=#E9E9E9
| 562433 ||  || — || October 14, 2010 || Catalina || CSS ||  || align=right | 1.5 km || 
|-id=434 bgcolor=#E9E9E9
| 562434 ||  || — || October 17, 2010 || Mount Lemmon || Mount Lemmon Survey ||  || align=right | 1.2 km || 
|-id=435 bgcolor=#E9E9E9
| 562435 ||  || — || December 7, 2015 || Haleakala || Pan-STARRS ||  || align=right | 1.5 km || 
|-id=436 bgcolor=#E9E9E9
| 562436 ||  || — || March 31, 2013 || Mount Lemmon || Mount Lemmon Survey ||  || align=right | 1.0 km || 
|-id=437 bgcolor=#E9E9E9
| 562437 ||  || — || November 14, 2002 || Palomar || NEAT ||  || align=right | 1.4 km || 
|-id=438 bgcolor=#E9E9E9
| 562438 ||  || — || December 16, 2011 || Mount Lemmon || Mount Lemmon Survey ||  || align=right | 1.2 km || 
|-id=439 bgcolor=#E9E9E9
| 562439 ||  || — || November 26, 2011 || Mount Lemmon || Mount Lemmon Survey ||  || align=right | 1.2 km || 
|-id=440 bgcolor=#E9E9E9
| 562440 ||  || — || November 18, 2007 || Mount Lemmon || Mount Lemmon Survey ||  || align=right | 1.2 km || 
|-id=441 bgcolor=#E9E9E9
| 562441 ||  || — || September 13, 2005 || Kitt Peak || Spacewatch ||  || align=right | 1.8 km || 
|-id=442 bgcolor=#E9E9E9
| 562442 ||  || — || December 14, 2001 || Kitt Peak || Spacewatch ||  || align=right | 2.2 km || 
|-id=443 bgcolor=#E9E9E9
| 562443 ||  || — || April 20, 2009 || Mount Lemmon || Mount Lemmon Survey ||  || align=right | 1.1 km || 
|-id=444 bgcolor=#E9E9E9
| 562444 ||  || — || December 13, 2006 || Mount Lemmon || Mount Lemmon Survey ||  || align=right | 1.8 km || 
|-id=445 bgcolor=#E9E9E9
| 562445 ||  || — || January 10, 2007 || Mount Lemmon || Mount Lemmon Survey ||  || align=right | 2.0 km || 
|-id=446 bgcolor=#E9E9E9
| 562446 Pilinszky ||  ||  || September 30, 2014 || Piszkesteto || K. Sárneczky, P. Székely ||  || align=right | 1.2 km || 
|-id=447 bgcolor=#E9E9E9
| 562447 ||  || — || February 20, 2012 || Haleakala || Pan-STARRS ||  || align=right | 1.6 km || 
|-id=448 bgcolor=#E9E9E9
| 562448 ||  || — || December 26, 1998 || Kitt Peak || Spacewatch ||  || align=right | 1.1 km || 
|-id=449 bgcolor=#E9E9E9
| 562449 ||  || — || December 9, 2015 || Mount Lemmon || Mount Lemmon Survey ||  || align=right data-sort-value="0.90" | 900 m || 
|-id=450 bgcolor=#d6d6d6
| 562450 ||  || — || September 12, 2009 || Kitt Peak || Spacewatch ||  || align=right | 2.4 km || 
|-id=451 bgcolor=#E9E9E9
| 562451 ||  || — || November 5, 2010 || Mount Lemmon || Mount Lemmon Survey ||  || align=right | 1.5 km || 
|-id=452 bgcolor=#E9E9E9
| 562452 ||  || — || July 4, 2014 || Haleakala || Pan-STARRS ||  || align=right data-sort-value="0.89" | 890 m || 
|-id=453 bgcolor=#E9E9E9
| 562453 ||  || — || October 13, 2010 || Mount Lemmon || Mount Lemmon Survey ||  || align=right | 1.6 km || 
|-id=454 bgcolor=#E9E9E9
| 562454 ||  || — || September 29, 2014 || Haleakala || Pan-STARRS ||  || align=right | 1.7 km || 
|-id=455 bgcolor=#E9E9E9
| 562455 ||  || — || May 4, 2000 || Apache Point || SDSS Collaboration ||  || align=right | 1.8 km || 
|-id=456 bgcolor=#E9E9E9
| 562456 ||  || — || December 21, 2006 || Kitt Peak || Spacewatch ||  || align=right | 1.9 km || 
|-id=457 bgcolor=#E9E9E9
| 562457 ||  || — || November 22, 2006 || Kitt Peak || Spacewatch ||  || align=right | 1.3 km || 
|-id=458 bgcolor=#E9E9E9
| 562458 ||  || — || August 30, 2005 || Kitt Peak || Spacewatch ||  || align=right | 2.0 km || 
|-id=459 bgcolor=#E9E9E9
| 562459 ||  || — || December 24, 2015 || Haleakala || Pan-STARRS ||  || align=right | 1.9 km || 
|-id=460 bgcolor=#E9E9E9
| 562460 ||  || — || December 21, 2015 || Mount Lemmon || Mount Lemmon Survey ||  || align=right | 1.3 km || 
|-id=461 bgcolor=#E9E9E9
| 562461 ||  || — || December 31, 2015 || Haleakala || Pan-STARRS ||  || align=right | 1.1 km || 
|-id=462 bgcolor=#E9E9E9
| 562462 ||  || — || January 4, 2003 || Socorro || LINEAR ||  || align=right | 1.4 km || 
|-id=463 bgcolor=#fefefe
| 562463 ||  || — || November 23, 2015 || Haleakala || Pan-STARRS || H || align=right data-sort-value="0.57" | 570 m || 
|-id=464 bgcolor=#E9E9E9
| 562464 ||  || — || December 7, 2015 || Haleakala || Pan-STARRS ||  || align=right data-sort-value="0.74" | 740 m || 
|-id=465 bgcolor=#E9E9E9
| 562465 ||  || — || February 10, 2008 || Mount Lemmon || Mount Lemmon Survey ||  || align=right | 1.5 km || 
|-id=466 bgcolor=#E9E9E9
| 562466 ||  || — || March 13, 2012 || Mount Lemmon || Mount Lemmon Survey ||  || align=right | 1.4 km || 
|-id=467 bgcolor=#E9E9E9
| 562467 ||  || — || October 8, 2015 || Haleakala || Pan-STARRS ||  || align=right data-sort-value="0.81" | 810 m || 
|-id=468 bgcolor=#E9E9E9
| 562468 ||  || — || October 1, 2005 || Mount Lemmon || Mount Lemmon Survey ||  || align=right | 1.7 km || 
|-id=469 bgcolor=#E9E9E9
| 562469 ||  || — || January 20, 2012 || Haleakala || Pan-STARRS ||  || align=right | 1.3 km || 
|-id=470 bgcolor=#E9E9E9
| 562470 ||  || — || November 14, 2006 || Catalina || CSS ||  || align=right | 1.6 km || 
|-id=471 bgcolor=#E9E9E9
| 562471 ||  || — || December 13, 2006 || Kitt Peak || Spacewatch ||  || align=right | 2.1 km || 
|-id=472 bgcolor=#E9E9E9
| 562472 ||  || — || January 2, 2012 || Mount Lemmon || Mount Lemmon Survey ||  || align=right | 1.4 km || 
|-id=473 bgcolor=#E9E9E9
| 562473 ||  || — || December 14, 2006 || Mount Lemmon || Mount Lemmon Survey ||  || align=right | 3.1 km || 
|-id=474 bgcolor=#E9E9E9
| 562474 ||  || — || April 24, 2004 || Kitt Peak || Spacewatch ||  || align=right | 1.4 km || 
|-id=475 bgcolor=#E9E9E9
| 562475 ||  || — || November 6, 2010 || Mount Lemmon || Mount Lemmon Survey ||  || align=right | 1.7 km || 
|-id=476 bgcolor=#E9E9E9
| 562476 ||  || — || November 11, 2010 || Kitt Peak || Spacewatch ||  || align=right | 2.4 km || 
|-id=477 bgcolor=#E9E9E9
| 562477 ||  || — || October 29, 2005 || Mount Lemmon || Mount Lemmon Survey ||  || align=right | 2.2 km || 
|-id=478 bgcolor=#E9E9E9
| 562478 ||  || — || December 26, 2006 || Kitt Peak || Spacewatch ||  || align=right | 2.3 km || 
|-id=479 bgcolor=#E9E9E9
| 562479 ||  || — || November 14, 2015 || Mount Lemmon || Mount Lemmon Survey ||  || align=right | 1.4 km || 
|-id=480 bgcolor=#E9E9E9
| 562480 ||  || — || January 27, 2012 || Mount Lemmon || Mount Lemmon Survey ||  || align=right | 1.4 km || 
|-id=481 bgcolor=#E9E9E9
| 562481 ||  || — || January 19, 2012 || Haleakala || Pan-STARRS ||  || align=right | 1.6 km || 
|-id=482 bgcolor=#E9E9E9
| 562482 ||  || — || May 16, 2009 || Kitt Peak || Spacewatch ||  || align=right | 1.8 km || 
|-id=483 bgcolor=#E9E9E9
| 562483 ||  || — || February 28, 2012 || Haleakala || Pan-STARRS ||  || align=right | 1.1 km || 
|-id=484 bgcolor=#E9E9E9
| 562484 ||  || — || December 1, 2006 || Mount Lemmon || Mount Lemmon Survey ||  || align=right | 1.6 km || 
|-id=485 bgcolor=#E9E9E9
| 562485 ||  || — || November 5, 2010 || Mount Lemmon || Mount Lemmon Survey ||  || align=right | 2.3 km || 
|-id=486 bgcolor=#E9E9E9
| 562486 ||  || — || November 19, 2006 || Catalina || CSS ||  || align=right | 1.6 km || 
|-id=487 bgcolor=#E9E9E9
| 562487 ||  || — || February 4, 2012 || Haleakala || Pan-STARRS ||  || align=right data-sort-value="0.99" | 990 m || 
|-id=488 bgcolor=#E9E9E9
| 562488 ||  || — || January 15, 2007 || Mauna Kea || Mauna Kea Obs. ||  || align=right data-sort-value="0.87" | 870 m || 
|-id=489 bgcolor=#E9E9E9
| 562489 ||  || — || October 20, 2006 || Kitt Peak || Spacewatch ||  || align=right | 1.1 km || 
|-id=490 bgcolor=#E9E9E9
| 562490 ||  || — || December 13, 2006 || Mount Lemmon || Mount Lemmon Survey ||  || align=right | 2.2 km || 
|-id=491 bgcolor=#d6d6d6
| 562491 ||  || — || December 14, 2015 || Mount Lemmon || Mount Lemmon Survey ||  || align=right | 2.6 km || 
|-id=492 bgcolor=#E9E9E9
| 562492 ||  || — || September 17, 2006 || Kitt Peak || Spacewatch ||  || align=right data-sort-value="0.87" | 870 m || 
|-id=493 bgcolor=#E9E9E9
| 562493 ||  || — || January 21, 2012 || Kitt Peak || Spacewatch ||  || align=right | 1.2 km || 
|-id=494 bgcolor=#E9E9E9
| 562494 ||  || — || December 27, 2006 || Mount Lemmon || Mount Lemmon Survey ||  || align=right | 2.1 km || 
|-id=495 bgcolor=#E9E9E9
| 562495 ||  || — || January 3, 2016 || Haleakala || Pan-STARRS ||  || align=right | 1.8 km || 
|-id=496 bgcolor=#E9E9E9
| 562496 ||  || — || March 12, 2007 || Mount Lemmon || Mount Lemmon Survey ||  || align=right | 1.9 km || 
|-id=497 bgcolor=#E9E9E9
| 562497 ||  || — || July 25, 2014 || Haleakala || Pan-STARRS ||  || align=right | 1.2 km || 
|-id=498 bgcolor=#E9E9E9
| 562498 ||  || — || December 14, 2010 || Mount Lemmon || Mount Lemmon Survey ||  || align=right | 2.1 km || 
|-id=499 bgcolor=#E9E9E9
| 562499 ||  || — || September 30, 2006 || Mount Lemmon || Mount Lemmon Survey ||  || align=right data-sort-value="0.76" | 760 m || 
|-id=500 bgcolor=#E9E9E9
| 562500 ||  || — || November 24, 2006 || Mount Lemmon || Mount Lemmon Survey ||  || align=right | 1.0 km || 
|}

562501–562600 

|-bgcolor=#E9E9E9
| 562501 ||  || — || December 27, 2006 || Kitt Peak || Spacewatch ||  || align=right | 2.4 km || 
|-id=502 bgcolor=#E9E9E9
| 562502 ||  || — || December 10, 2015 || Oukaimeden || M. Ory ||  || align=right | 1.5 km || 
|-id=503 bgcolor=#E9E9E9
| 562503 ||  || — || October 1, 2010 || Kitt Peak || Spacewatch ||  || align=right | 1.5 km || 
|-id=504 bgcolor=#E9E9E9
| 562504 ||  || — || February 20, 2012 || Haleakala || Pan-STARRS ||  || align=right | 2.0 km || 
|-id=505 bgcolor=#fefefe
| 562505 ||  || — || October 9, 2007 || Kitt Peak || Spacewatch ||  || align=right data-sort-value="0.64" | 640 m || 
|-id=506 bgcolor=#E9E9E9
| 562506 ||  || — || December 3, 2015 || Mount Lemmon || Mount Lemmon Survey ||  || align=right | 1.3 km || 
|-id=507 bgcolor=#E9E9E9
| 562507 ||  || — || January 20, 2012 || Kitt Peak || Spacewatch ||  || align=right | 1.4 km || 
|-id=508 bgcolor=#E9E9E9
| 562508 ||  || — || March 28, 2008 || Kitt Peak || Spacewatch ||  || align=right | 1.1 km || 
|-id=509 bgcolor=#d6d6d6
| 562509 ||  || — || April 10, 2002 || Palomar || NEAT ||  || align=right | 3.1 km || 
|-id=510 bgcolor=#E9E9E9
| 562510 ||  || — || March 31, 2008 || Kitt Peak || Spacewatch ||  || align=right | 1.1 km || 
|-id=511 bgcolor=#E9E9E9
| 562511 ||  || — || November 14, 2010 || Kitt Peak || Spacewatch ||  || align=right | 2.0 km || 
|-id=512 bgcolor=#E9E9E9
| 562512 ||  || — || September 19, 2010 || Bergisch Gladbach || W. Bickel ||  || align=right | 1.8 km || 
|-id=513 bgcolor=#d6d6d6
| 562513 ||  || — || March 6, 2011 || Mount Lemmon || Mount Lemmon Survey ||  || align=right | 1.9 km || 
|-id=514 bgcolor=#E9E9E9
| 562514 ||  || — || January 3, 2016 || Mount Lemmon || Mount Lemmon Survey ||  || align=right | 2.0 km || 
|-id=515 bgcolor=#fefefe
| 562515 ||  || — || October 11, 2007 || Catalina || CSS ||  || align=right data-sort-value="0.99" | 990 m || 
|-id=516 bgcolor=#E9E9E9
| 562516 ||  || — || November 11, 2010 || Mount Lemmon || Mount Lemmon Survey ||  || align=right | 2.0 km || 
|-id=517 bgcolor=#E9E9E9
| 562517 ||  || — || September 18, 2014 || Haleakala || Pan-STARRS ||  || align=right data-sort-value="0.84" | 840 m || 
|-id=518 bgcolor=#E9E9E9
| 562518 ||  || — || April 14, 2008 || Mount Lemmon || Mount Lemmon Survey ||  || align=right | 1.5 km || 
|-id=519 bgcolor=#E9E9E9
| 562519 ||  || — || December 25, 2010 || Mount Lemmon || Mount Lemmon Survey ||  || align=right | 2.2 km || 
|-id=520 bgcolor=#E9E9E9
| 562520 ||  || — || August 28, 2014 || Haleakala || Pan-STARRS ||  || align=right | 1.6 km || 
|-id=521 bgcolor=#E9E9E9
| 562521 ||  || — || November 6, 2015 || Mount Lemmon || Mount Lemmon Survey ||  || align=right | 1.6 km || 
|-id=522 bgcolor=#E9E9E9
| 562522 ||  || — || January 28, 2007 || Mount Lemmon || Mount Lemmon Survey ||  || align=right | 1.7 km || 
|-id=523 bgcolor=#E9E9E9
| 562523 ||  || — || October 2, 2006 || Kitt Peak || Spacewatch ||  || align=right data-sort-value="0.76" | 760 m || 
|-id=524 bgcolor=#E9E9E9
| 562524 ||  || — || December 31, 2007 || Mount Lemmon || Mount Lemmon Survey ||  || align=right data-sort-value="0.93" | 930 m || 
|-id=525 bgcolor=#E9E9E9
| 562525 ||  || — || January 21, 2012 || Kitt Peak || Spacewatch ||  || align=right | 1.6 km || 
|-id=526 bgcolor=#E9E9E9
| 562526 ||  || — || March 30, 2008 || Kitt Peak || Spacewatch ||  || align=right | 1.4 km || 
|-id=527 bgcolor=#E9E9E9
| 562527 ||  || — || February 9, 2008 || Kitt Peak || Spacewatch ||  || align=right | 1.5 km || 
|-id=528 bgcolor=#E9E9E9
| 562528 ||  || — || December 30, 2015 || Mount Lemmon || Mount Lemmon Survey ||  || align=right | 1.5 km || 
|-id=529 bgcolor=#E9E9E9
| 562529 ||  || — || October 13, 2010 || Mount Lemmon || Mount Lemmon Survey ||  || align=right | 1.4 km || 
|-id=530 bgcolor=#E9E9E9
| 562530 ||  || — || January 1, 2012 || Mount Lemmon || Mount Lemmon Survey ||  || align=right data-sort-value="0.78" | 780 m || 
|-id=531 bgcolor=#d6d6d6
| 562531 ||  || — || March 14, 2012 || Mount Lemmon || Mount Lemmon Survey ||  || align=right | 2.6 km || 
|-id=532 bgcolor=#E9E9E9
| 562532 ||  || — || January 11, 2008 || Kitt Peak || Spacewatch ||  || align=right data-sort-value="0.92" | 920 m || 
|-id=533 bgcolor=#E9E9E9
| 562533 ||  || — || December 22, 2006 || Kitt Peak || Spacewatch ||  || align=right | 1.0 km || 
|-id=534 bgcolor=#fefefe
| 562534 ||  || — || October 7, 2007 || Mount Lemmon || Mount Lemmon Survey ||  || align=right data-sort-value="0.56" | 560 m || 
|-id=535 bgcolor=#E9E9E9
| 562535 ||  || — || January 2, 2008 || Bergisch Gladbach || W. Bickel ||  || align=right data-sort-value="0.96" | 960 m || 
|-id=536 bgcolor=#fefefe
| 562536 ||  || — || October 24, 2003 || Kitt Peak || Spacewatch ||  || align=right data-sort-value="0.75" | 750 m || 
|-id=537 bgcolor=#E9E9E9
| 562537 ||  || — || October 9, 2010 || Mount Lemmon || Mount Lemmon Survey ||  || align=right | 1.9 km || 
|-id=538 bgcolor=#fefefe
| 562538 ||  || — || March 8, 2005 || Mount Lemmon || Mount Lemmon Survey ||  || align=right data-sort-value="0.85" | 850 m || 
|-id=539 bgcolor=#E9E9E9
| 562539 ||  || — || November 22, 2006 || Kitt Peak || Spacewatch ||  || align=right | 1.5 km || 
|-id=540 bgcolor=#E9E9E9
| 562540 ||  || — || December 13, 2006 || Kitt Peak || Spacewatch ||  || align=right | 1.8 km || 
|-id=541 bgcolor=#E9E9E9
| 562541 ||  || — || February 23, 2007 || Cerro Tololo || Spacewatch ||  || align=right | 1.7 km || 
|-id=542 bgcolor=#E9E9E9
| 562542 ||  || — || October 11, 2001 || Kitt Peak || Spacewatch ||  || align=right | 1.3 km || 
|-id=543 bgcolor=#E9E9E9
| 562543 ||  || — || November 3, 2010 || Mount Lemmon || Mount Lemmon Survey ||  || align=right | 1.0 km || 
|-id=544 bgcolor=#E9E9E9
| 562544 ||  || — || August 25, 2014 || Haleakala || Pan-STARRS ||  || align=right | 2.4 km || 
|-id=545 bgcolor=#E9E9E9
| 562545 ||  || — || October 28, 2010 || Mount Lemmon || Mount Lemmon Survey ||  || align=right | 1.2 km || 
|-id=546 bgcolor=#E9E9E9
| 562546 ||  || — || November 15, 2010 || Mount Lemmon || Mount Lemmon Survey ||  || align=right | 2.1 km || 
|-id=547 bgcolor=#fefefe
| 562547 ||  || — || April 17, 2009 || Catalina || CSS ||  || align=right | 1.0 km || 
|-id=548 bgcolor=#E9E9E9
| 562548 ||  || — || December 1, 2006 || Mount Lemmon || Mount Lemmon Survey ||  || align=right | 1.5 km || 
|-id=549 bgcolor=#E9E9E9
| 562549 ||  || — || January 4, 2016 || Haleakala || Pan-STARRS ||  || align=right | 1.5 km || 
|-id=550 bgcolor=#E9E9E9
| 562550 ||  || — || November 20, 2006 || Kitt Peak || Spacewatch ||  || align=right | 1.5 km || 
|-id=551 bgcolor=#fefefe
| 562551 ||  || — || September 22, 2011 || Kitt Peak || Spacewatch ||  || align=right data-sort-value="0.53" | 530 m || 
|-id=552 bgcolor=#E9E9E9
| 562552 ||  || — || November 18, 2006 || Kitt Peak || Spacewatch ||  || align=right | 1.2 km || 
|-id=553 bgcolor=#fefefe
| 562553 ||  || — || January 4, 2016 || Haleakala || Pan-STARRS ||  || align=right data-sort-value="0.99" | 990 m || 
|-id=554 bgcolor=#E9E9E9
| 562554 ||  || — || September 26, 2006 || Catalina || CSS ||  || align=right | 1.3 km || 
|-id=555 bgcolor=#E9E9E9
| 562555 ||  || — || May 17, 2013 || Mount Lemmon || Mount Lemmon Survey ||  || align=right data-sort-value="0.72" | 720 m || 
|-id=556 bgcolor=#E9E9E9
| 562556 ||  || — || December 26, 2011 || Mount Lemmon || Mount Lemmon Survey ||  || align=right data-sort-value="0.91" | 910 m || 
|-id=557 bgcolor=#C2FFFF
| 562557 ||  || — || December 12, 2014 || Haleakala || Pan-STARRS || L5 || align=right | 9.9 km || 
|-id=558 bgcolor=#E9E9E9
| 562558 ||  || — || October 12, 2005 || Kitt Peak || Spacewatch ||  || align=right | 1.8 km || 
|-id=559 bgcolor=#E9E9E9
| 562559 ||  || — || October 1, 2014 || Haleakala || Pan-STARRS ||  || align=right | 1.5 km || 
|-id=560 bgcolor=#E9E9E9
| 562560 ||  || — || November 27, 2011 || Mount Lemmon || Mount Lemmon Survey ||  || align=right | 1.1 km || 
|-id=561 bgcolor=#E9E9E9
| 562561 ||  || — || October 30, 2010 || Kitt Peak || Spacewatch ||  || align=right | 1.8 km || 
|-id=562 bgcolor=#E9E9E9
| 562562 ||  || — || December 12, 2015 || Haleakala || Pan-STARRS ||  || align=right data-sort-value="0.97" | 970 m || 
|-id=563 bgcolor=#E9E9E9
| 562563 ||  || — || December 25, 2010 || Mount Lemmon || Mount Lemmon Survey ||  || align=right | 2.4 km || 
|-id=564 bgcolor=#d6d6d6
| 562564 ||  || — || August 25, 2014 || Haleakala || Pan-STARRS ||  || align=right | 2.1 km || 
|-id=565 bgcolor=#E9E9E9
| 562565 ||  || — || March 13, 2012 || Mount Lemmon || Mount Lemmon Survey ||  || align=right | 1.2 km || 
|-id=566 bgcolor=#E9E9E9
| 562566 ||  || — || November 22, 2014 || Haleakala || Pan-STARRS ||  || align=right | 2.4 km || 
|-id=567 bgcolor=#E9E9E9
| 562567 ||  || — || November 16, 2006 || Catalina || CSS ||  || align=right | 1.9 km || 
|-id=568 bgcolor=#E9E9E9
| 562568 ||  || — || September 10, 2010 || Mount Lemmon || Mount Lemmon Survey ||  || align=right | 1.2 km || 
|-id=569 bgcolor=#E9E9E9
| 562569 ||  || — || January 26, 2012 || Kitt Peak || Spacewatch ||  || align=right data-sort-value="0.94" | 940 m || 
|-id=570 bgcolor=#E9E9E9
| 562570 ||  || — || October 28, 2010 || Mount Lemmon || Mount Lemmon Survey ||  || align=right | 1.4 km || 
|-id=571 bgcolor=#E9E9E9
| 562571 ||  || — || August 23, 2014 || Haleakala || Pan-STARRS ||  || align=right | 1.2 km || 
|-id=572 bgcolor=#E9E9E9
| 562572 ||  || — || August 30, 2000 || La Silla || La Silla Obs. ||  || align=right | 1.8 km || 
|-id=573 bgcolor=#E9E9E9
| 562573 ||  || — || March 22, 2012 || Mount Lemmon || Mount Lemmon Survey ||  || align=right | 1.3 km || 
|-id=574 bgcolor=#fefefe
| 562574 ||  || — || March 23, 2006 || Mount Lemmon || Mount Lemmon Survey ||  || align=right data-sort-value="0.88" | 880 m || 
|-id=575 bgcolor=#E9E9E9
| 562575 ||  || — || September 23, 2015 || Haleakala || Pan-STARRS ||  || align=right | 1.7 km || 
|-id=576 bgcolor=#E9E9E9
| 562576 ||  || — || December 18, 2007 || Uccle || T. Pauwels ||  || align=right | 1.3 km || 
|-id=577 bgcolor=#E9E9E9
| 562577 ||  || — || January 4, 2012 || Mount Lemmon || Mount Lemmon Survey ||  || align=right | 1.1 km || 
|-id=578 bgcolor=#fefefe
| 562578 ||  || — || December 1, 2008 || Mount Lemmon || Mount Lemmon Survey ||  || align=right data-sort-value="0.66" | 660 m || 
|-id=579 bgcolor=#E9E9E9
| 562579 ||  || — || March 8, 2008 || Kitt Peak || Spacewatch ||  || align=right | 1.1 km || 
|-id=580 bgcolor=#E9E9E9
| 562580 ||  || — || October 28, 2002 || Palomar || NEAT ||  || align=right | 1.3 km || 
|-id=581 bgcolor=#d6d6d6
| 562581 ||  || — || August 22, 2014 || Haleakala || Pan-STARRS ||  || align=right | 3.4 km || 
|-id=582 bgcolor=#E9E9E9
| 562582 ||  || — || December 15, 2007 || Mount Lemmon || Mount Lemmon Survey ||  || align=right data-sort-value="0.81" | 810 m || 
|-id=583 bgcolor=#fefefe
| 562583 ||  || — || October 12, 2007 || Mount Lemmon || Mount Lemmon Survey ||  || align=right data-sort-value="0.99" | 990 m || 
|-id=584 bgcolor=#fefefe
| 562584 ||  || — || September 15, 2007 || Kitt Peak || Spacewatch ||  || align=right data-sort-value="0.66" | 660 m || 
|-id=585 bgcolor=#C2FFFF
| 562585 ||  || — || October 28, 2014 || Haleakala || Pan-STARRS || L5 || align=right | 9.2 km || 
|-id=586 bgcolor=#E9E9E9
| 562586 ||  || — || September 4, 2010 || Mount Lemmon || Mount Lemmon Survey ||  || align=right | 1.7 km || 
|-id=587 bgcolor=#E9E9E9
| 562587 ||  || — || February 3, 2008 || Kitt Peak || Spacewatch ||  || align=right | 1.1 km || 
|-id=588 bgcolor=#E9E9E9
| 562588 ||  || — || May 21, 2014 || Haleakala || Pan-STARRS ||  || align=right data-sort-value="0.88" | 880 m || 
|-id=589 bgcolor=#E9E9E9
| 562589 ||  || — || December 9, 2015 || Haleakala || Pan-STARRS ||  || align=right data-sort-value="0.68" | 680 m || 
|-id=590 bgcolor=#E9E9E9
| 562590 ||  || — || December 24, 2015 || Haleakala || Pan-STARRS ||  || align=right | 1.6 km || 
|-id=591 bgcolor=#d6d6d6
| 562591 ||  || — || November 7, 2010 || Mount Lemmon || Mount Lemmon Survey ||  || align=right | 3.1 km || 
|-id=592 bgcolor=#E9E9E9
| 562592 ||  || — || August 25, 2014 || Haleakala || Pan-STARRS ||  || align=right | 1.3 km || 
|-id=593 bgcolor=#E9E9E9
| 562593 ||  || — || December 18, 2001 || Socorro || LINEAR ||  || align=right | 2.3 km || 
|-id=594 bgcolor=#E9E9E9
| 562594 ||  || — || June 18, 2013 || Haleakala || Pan-STARRS ||  || align=right | 1.3 km || 
|-id=595 bgcolor=#E9E9E9
| 562595 ||  || — || February 6, 2008 || Catalina || CSS ||  || align=right data-sort-value="0.92" | 920 m || 
|-id=596 bgcolor=#E9E9E9
| 562596 ||  || — || February 25, 2012 || Mayhill-ISON || L. Elenin ||  || align=right | 1.7 km || 
|-id=597 bgcolor=#E9E9E9
| 562597 ||  || — || March 13, 2013 || Flagstaff || Lowell Discovery Tel. ||  || align=right data-sort-value="0.77" | 770 m || 
|-id=598 bgcolor=#E9E9E9
| 562598 ||  || — || October 4, 2014 || Mount Lemmon || Mount Lemmon Survey ||  || align=right | 1.7 km || 
|-id=599 bgcolor=#E9E9E9
| 562599 ||  || — || February 7, 2002 || Kitt Peak || Spacewatch ||  || align=right | 2.0 km || 
|-id=600 bgcolor=#E9E9E9
| 562600 ||  || — || January 28, 2007 || Kitt Peak || Spacewatch ||  || align=right | 1.9 km || 
|}

562601–562700 

|-bgcolor=#E9E9E9
| 562601 ||  || — || January 27, 2007 || Kitt Peak || Spacewatch || MRX || align=right data-sort-value="0.88" | 880 m || 
|-id=602 bgcolor=#E9E9E9
| 562602 ||  || — || September 30, 2014 || Mount Lemmon || Mount Lemmon Survey ||  || align=right | 1.7 km || 
|-id=603 bgcolor=#E9E9E9
| 562603 ||  || — || November 12, 2010 || Mount Lemmon || Mount Lemmon Survey || EUN || align=right | 1.2 km || 
|-id=604 bgcolor=#E9E9E9
| 562604 ||  || — || February 23, 2007 || Kitt Peak || Spacewatch ||  || align=right | 2.0 km || 
|-id=605 bgcolor=#E9E9E9
| 562605 ||  || — || March 27, 2012 || Mount Lemmon || Mount Lemmon Survey ||  || align=right | 2.2 km || 
|-id=606 bgcolor=#E9E9E9
| 562606 ||  || — || April 27, 2012 || Haleakala || Pan-STARRS ||  || align=right | 2.0 km || 
|-id=607 bgcolor=#E9E9E9
| 562607 ||  || — || October 19, 2006 || Kitt Peak || Spacewatch ||  || align=right | 1.3 km || 
|-id=608 bgcolor=#d6d6d6
| 562608 ||  || — || March 14, 2007 || Kitt Peak || Spacewatch || KOR || align=right | 1.0 km || 
|-id=609 bgcolor=#E9E9E9
| 562609 ||  || — || October 1, 2005 || Mount Lemmon || Mount Lemmon Survey ||  || align=right | 1.6 km || 
|-id=610 bgcolor=#E9E9E9
| 562610 ||  || — || January 7, 2016 || Haleakala || Pan-STARRS ||  || align=right | 2.1 km || 
|-id=611 bgcolor=#E9E9E9
| 562611 ||  || — || December 21, 2006 || Mount Lemmon || Mount Lemmon Survey ||  || align=right | 1.1 km || 
|-id=612 bgcolor=#E9E9E9
| 562612 ||  || — || September 2, 2014 || Mount Lemmon || Mount Lemmon Survey ||  || align=right data-sort-value="0.81" | 810 m || 
|-id=613 bgcolor=#E9E9E9
| 562613 ||  || — || February 13, 2008 || Kitt Peak || Spacewatch || MAR || align=right data-sort-value="0.69" | 690 m || 
|-id=614 bgcolor=#E9E9E9
| 562614 ||  || — || November 1, 2010 || Kitt Peak || Spacewatch ||  || align=right | 1.5 km || 
|-id=615 bgcolor=#E9E9E9
| 562615 ||  || — || October 28, 2010 || Mount Lemmon || Mount Lemmon Survey ||  || align=right | 1.7 km || 
|-id=616 bgcolor=#E9E9E9
| 562616 ||  || — || October 25, 2005 || Kitt Peak || Spacewatch ||  || align=right | 1.5 km || 
|-id=617 bgcolor=#E9E9E9
| 562617 ||  || — || November 14, 2010 || Mount Lemmon || Mount Lemmon Survey ||  || align=right | 1.4 km || 
|-id=618 bgcolor=#E9E9E9
| 562618 ||  || — || October 25, 2014 || Mount Lemmon || Mount Lemmon Survey ||  || align=right | 1.2 km || 
|-id=619 bgcolor=#E9E9E9
| 562619 ||  || — || October 5, 2002 || Palomar || NEAT ||  || align=right | 1.0 km || 
|-id=620 bgcolor=#E9E9E9
| 562620 ||  || — || April 28, 2012 || Mount Lemmon || Mount Lemmon Survey ||  || align=right | 2.0 km || 
|-id=621 bgcolor=#E9E9E9
| 562621 ||  || — || November 3, 2010 || Mayhill-ISON || L. Elenin ||  || align=right | 1.2 km || 
|-id=622 bgcolor=#E9E9E9
| 562622 ||  || — || January 5, 2003 || Socorro || LINEAR || JUN || align=right | 1.1 km || 
|-id=623 bgcolor=#E9E9E9
| 562623 ||  || — || July 30, 2009 || Kitt Peak || Spacewatch ||  || align=right | 2.4 km || 
|-id=624 bgcolor=#E9E9E9
| 562624 ||  || — || November 18, 2006 || Mount Lemmon || Mount Lemmon Survey ||  || align=right | 1.7 km || 
|-id=625 bgcolor=#E9E9E9
| 562625 ||  || — || June 6, 2013 || Mount Lemmon || Mount Lemmon Survey ||  || align=right | 1.5 km || 
|-id=626 bgcolor=#E9E9E9
| 562626 ||  || — || February 21, 2002 || Kitt Peak || Spacewatch ||  || align=right | 1.6 km || 
|-id=627 bgcolor=#E9E9E9
| 562627 ||  || — || October 2, 2014 || Kitt Peak || Pan-STARRS ||  || align=right | 2.4 km || 
|-id=628 bgcolor=#E9E9E9
| 562628 ||  || — || August 6, 2014 || Haleakala || Pan-STARRS ||  || align=right | 1.5 km || 
|-id=629 bgcolor=#E9E9E9
| 562629 ||  || — || January 27, 2007 || Kitt Peak || Spacewatch ||  || align=right | 1.9 km || 
|-id=630 bgcolor=#E9E9E9
| 562630 ||  || — || September 19, 2009 || Kitt Peak || Spacewatch ||  || align=right | 2.0 km || 
|-id=631 bgcolor=#d6d6d6
| 562631 ||  || — || January 8, 2016 || Haleakala || Pan-STARRS ||  || align=right | 1.9 km || 
|-id=632 bgcolor=#E9E9E9
| 562632 ||  || — || October 13, 2005 || Bergisch Gladbach || W. Bickel ||  || align=right | 1.7 km || 
|-id=633 bgcolor=#E9E9E9
| 562633 ||  || — || June 26, 2014 || Mount Lemmon || Mount Lemmon Survey || JUN || align=right | 1.1 km || 
|-id=634 bgcolor=#E9E9E9
| 562634 ||  || — || December 14, 2010 || Mount Lemmon || Mount Lemmon Survey ||  || align=right | 1.6 km || 
|-id=635 bgcolor=#E9E9E9
| 562635 ||  || — || January 8, 2016 || Haleakala || Pan-STARRS ||  || align=right | 1.2 km || 
|-id=636 bgcolor=#E9E9E9
| 562636 ||  || — || February 22, 2007 || Kitt Peak || Spacewatch || EUN || align=right data-sort-value="0.87" | 870 m || 
|-id=637 bgcolor=#E9E9E9
| 562637 ||  || — || February 26, 2012 || Kitt Peak || Mount Lemmon Survey ||  || align=right | 1.1 km || 
|-id=638 bgcolor=#E9E9E9
| 562638 ||  || — || January 27, 2007 || Kitt Peak || Spacewatch || NEM || align=right | 2.4 km || 
|-id=639 bgcolor=#E9E9E9
| 562639 ||  || — || October 29, 2014 || Haleakala || Pan-STARRS ||  || align=right | 2.0 km || 
|-id=640 bgcolor=#E9E9E9
| 562640 ||  || — || February 22, 2002 || Palomar || NEAT ||  || align=right | 2.5 km || 
|-id=641 bgcolor=#E9E9E9
| 562641 ||  || — || November 6, 2010 || Mount Lemmon || Mount Lemmon Survey ||  || align=right | 1.3 km || 
|-id=642 bgcolor=#E9E9E9
| 562642 ||  || — || January 8, 2016 || Haleakala || Pan-STARRS ||  || align=right | 1.6 km || 
|-id=643 bgcolor=#E9E9E9
| 562643 ||  || — || March 13, 2012 || Mount Lemmon || Mount Lemmon Survey ||  || align=right | 1.3 km || 
|-id=644 bgcolor=#d6d6d6
| 562644 ||  || — || December 26, 2009 || Kitt Peak || Spacewatch ||  || align=right | 3.6 km || 
|-id=645 bgcolor=#E9E9E9
| 562645 ||  || — || November 21, 2006 || Mount Lemmon || Mount Lemmon Survey ||  || align=right | 1.7 km || 
|-id=646 bgcolor=#d6d6d6
| 562646 ||  || — || April 20, 2006 || Mount Lemmon || Mount Lemmon Survey ||  || align=right | 3.5 km || 
|-id=647 bgcolor=#d6d6d6
| 562647 ||  || — || February 25, 2011 || Kitt Peak || Spacewatch ||  || align=right | 2.8 km || 
|-id=648 bgcolor=#E9E9E9
| 562648 ||  || — || November 15, 2010 || Mount Lemmon || Mount Lemmon Survey ||  || align=right | 2.3 km || 
|-id=649 bgcolor=#d6d6d6
| 562649 ||  || — || September 29, 2013 || Haleakala || Pan-STARRS ||  || align=right | 3.2 km || 
|-id=650 bgcolor=#d6d6d6
| 562650 ||  || — || March 29, 2000 || Socorro || LINEAR ||  || align=right | 2.6 km || 
|-id=651 bgcolor=#d6d6d6
| 562651 ||  || — || October 8, 2008 || Mount Lemmon || Mount Lemmon Survey ||  || align=right | 2.7 km || 
|-id=652 bgcolor=#E9E9E9
| 562652 ||  || — || March 2, 2008 || Mount Lemmon || Mount Lemmon Survey ||  || align=right | 1.0 km || 
|-id=653 bgcolor=#E9E9E9
| 562653 ||  || — || January 19, 2012 || Catalina || CSS ||  || align=right | 1.1 km || 
|-id=654 bgcolor=#E9E9E9
| 562654 ||  || — || December 18, 2007 || Mount Lemmon || Mount Lemmon Survey ||  || align=right data-sort-value="0.87" | 870 m || 
|-id=655 bgcolor=#E9E9E9
| 562655 ||  || — || November 8, 2010 || Mount Lemmon || Mount Lemmon Survey ||  || align=right | 1.2 km || 
|-id=656 bgcolor=#E9E9E9
| 562656 ||  || — || February 8, 2007 || Palomar || NEAT ||  || align=right | 2.9 km || 
|-id=657 bgcolor=#E9E9E9
| 562657 ||  || — || January 2, 2012 || Mount Lemmon || Mount Lemmon Survey ||  || align=right data-sort-value="0.78" | 780 m || 
|-id=658 bgcolor=#E9E9E9
| 562658 ||  || — || April 25, 2003 || Kitt Peak || Spacewatch ||  || align=right | 2.0 km || 
|-id=659 bgcolor=#d6d6d6
| 562659 ||  || — || September 6, 2014 || Mount Lemmon || Mount Lemmon Survey ||  || align=right | 2.2 km || 
|-id=660 bgcolor=#E9E9E9
| 562660 ||  || — || October 17, 2014 || Mount Lemmon || Mount Lemmon Survey ||  || align=right | 2.5 km || 
|-id=661 bgcolor=#d6d6d6
| 562661 ||  || — || November 22, 2005 || Kitt Peak || Spacewatch || 615 || align=right | 1.3 km || 
|-id=662 bgcolor=#E9E9E9
| 562662 ||  || — || January 9, 2016 || Haleakala || Pan-STARRS ||  || align=right | 1.4 km || 
|-id=663 bgcolor=#E9E9E9
| 562663 ||  || — || February 17, 2007 || Mount Lemmon || Mount Lemmon Survey ||  || align=right | 1.7 km || 
|-id=664 bgcolor=#E9E9E9
| 562664 ||  || — || February 22, 2007 || Kitt Peak || Spacewatch ||  || align=right | 1.7 km || 
|-id=665 bgcolor=#d6d6d6
| 562665 ||  || — || December 6, 2015 || Haleakala || Pan-STARRS ||  || align=right | 2.3 km || 
|-id=666 bgcolor=#d6d6d6
| 562666 ||  || — || September 19, 2014 || Haleakala || Pan-STARRS ||  || align=right | 2.2 km || 
|-id=667 bgcolor=#E9E9E9
| 562667 ||  || — || September 18, 2014 || Haleakala || Pan-STARRS ||  || align=right | 1.1 km || 
|-id=668 bgcolor=#E9E9E9
| 562668 ||  || — || October 17, 2010 || Mount Lemmon || Mount Lemmon Survey ||  || align=right | 1.4 km || 
|-id=669 bgcolor=#E9E9E9
| 562669 ||  || — || May 17, 2009 || Mount Lemmon || Mount Lemmon Survey ||  || align=right | 1.7 km || 
|-id=670 bgcolor=#d6d6d6
| 562670 ||  || — || August 29, 2014 || Mount Lemmon || Mount Lemmon Survey ||  || align=right | 2.4 km || 
|-id=671 bgcolor=#E9E9E9
| 562671 ||  || — || April 15, 2008 || Kitt Peak || Spacewatch ||  || align=right | 1.1 km || 
|-id=672 bgcolor=#E9E9E9
| 562672 ||  || — || April 7, 2008 || Kitt Peak || Spacewatch ||  || align=right | 1.8 km || 
|-id=673 bgcolor=#E9E9E9
| 562673 ||  || — || November 16, 2010 || Mount Lemmon || Mount Lemmon Survey ||  || align=right | 2.0 km || 
|-id=674 bgcolor=#E9E9E9
| 562674 ||  || — || February 10, 2007 || Mount Lemmon || Mount Lemmon Survey ||  || align=right | 2.2 km || 
|-id=675 bgcolor=#E9E9E9
| 562675 ||  || — || January 10, 2002 || Cima Ekar || Asiago Obs. ||  || align=right | 2.2 km || 
|-id=676 bgcolor=#E9E9E9
| 562676 ||  || — || September 9, 2010 || La Sagra || OAM Obs. ||  || align=right data-sort-value="0.96" | 960 m || 
|-id=677 bgcolor=#E9E9E9
| 562677 ||  || — || January 25, 2012 || Haleakala || Pan-STARRS ||  || align=right | 1.2 km || 
|-id=678 bgcolor=#E9E9E9
| 562678 ||  || — || March 6, 2008 || Mount Lemmon || Mount Lemmon Survey ||  || align=right data-sort-value="0.95" | 950 m || 
|-id=679 bgcolor=#E9E9E9
| 562679 ||  || — || April 14, 2008 || Kitt Peak || Spacewatch ||  || align=right | 1.2 km || 
|-id=680 bgcolor=#E9E9E9
| 562680 ||  || — || April 6, 2008 || Kitt Peak || CSS ||  || align=right | 1.9 km || 
|-id=681 bgcolor=#E9E9E9
| 562681 ||  || — || April 28, 2008 || Palomar || Mount Lemmon Survey ||  || align=right | 1.8 km || 
|-id=682 bgcolor=#E9E9E9
| 562682 ||  || — || October 29, 2010 || Kitt Peak || Spacewatch || EUN || align=right data-sort-value="0.85" | 850 m || 
|-id=683 bgcolor=#E9E9E9
| 562683 ||  || — || November 4, 2010 || Mount Lemmon || Mount Lemmon Survey ||  || align=right | 1.8 km || 
|-id=684 bgcolor=#E9E9E9
| 562684 ||  || — || January 11, 2016 || Haleakala || Pan-STARRS ||  || align=right | 1.6 km || 
|-id=685 bgcolor=#d6d6d6
| 562685 ||  || — || April 18, 2012 || Mount Lemmon || Mount Lemmon Survey ||  || align=right | 1.8 km || 
|-id=686 bgcolor=#E9E9E9
| 562686 ||  || — || September 20, 2009 || Kitt Peak || Spacewatch ||  || align=right | 1.7 km || 
|-id=687 bgcolor=#d6d6d6
| 562687 ||  || — || August 22, 2014 || Haleakala || Pan-STARRS || BRA || align=right | 1.5 km || 
|-id=688 bgcolor=#E9E9E9
| 562688 ||  || — || February 2, 2008 || Mount Lemmon || Mount Lemmon Survey ||  || align=right | 1.4 km || 
|-id=689 bgcolor=#E9E9E9
| 562689 ||  || — || November 7, 2010 || Mount Lemmon || Mount Lemmon Survey ||  || align=right | 2.2 km || 
|-id=690 bgcolor=#E9E9E9
| 562690 ||  || — || June 7, 2013 || Nogales || M. Schwartz, P. R. Holvorcem ||  || align=right | 1.5 km || 
|-id=691 bgcolor=#E9E9E9
| 562691 ||  || — || November 14, 2010 || Mount Lemmon || Mount Lemmon Survey ||  || align=right | 2.1 km || 
|-id=692 bgcolor=#E9E9E9
| 562692 ||  || — || October 6, 2002 || Anderson Mesa || LONEOS ||  || align=right | 1.3 km || 
|-id=693 bgcolor=#fefefe
| 562693 ||  || — || November 11, 2004 || Catalina || CSS ||  || align=right | 1.0 km || 
|-id=694 bgcolor=#E9E9E9
| 562694 ||  || — || December 31, 2015 || Kitt Peak || Spacewatch ||  || align=right | 1.3 km || 
|-id=695 bgcolor=#fefefe
| 562695 ||  || — || September 29, 2003 || Anderson Mesa || LONEOS ||  || align=right | 1.2 km || 
|-id=696 bgcolor=#E9E9E9
| 562696 ||  || — || January 3, 2016 || Haleakala || Pan-STARRS ||  || align=right | 1.4 km || 
|-id=697 bgcolor=#E9E9E9
| 562697 ||  || — || August 18, 2014 || Palomar || Pan-STARRS ||  || align=right | 2.3 km || 
|-id=698 bgcolor=#E9E9E9
| 562698 ||  || — || January 19, 2012 || Haleakala || Pan-STARRS ||  || align=right | 1.2 km || 
|-id=699 bgcolor=#E9E9E9
| 562699 ||  || — || June 18, 2013 || Haleakala || Pan-STARRS ||  || align=right | 2.1 km || 
|-id=700 bgcolor=#d6d6d6
| 562700 ||  || — || April 22, 2012 || Mount Lemmon || Mount Lemmon Survey ||  || align=right | 3.3 km || 
|}

562701–562800 

|-bgcolor=#E9E9E9
| 562701 ||  || — || May 3, 2013 || Mount Lemmon || Mount Lemmon Survey ||  || align=right | 1.9 km || 
|-id=702 bgcolor=#E9E9E9
| 562702 ||  || — || August 27, 2014 || Haleakala || Pan-STARRS ||  || align=right | 1.8 km || 
|-id=703 bgcolor=#E9E9E9
| 562703 ||  || — || April 15, 2012 || Haleakala || Pan-STARRS ||  || align=right | 1.5 km || 
|-id=704 bgcolor=#E9E9E9
| 562704 ||  || — || January 11, 2016 || Haleakala || Pan-STARRS ||  || align=right | 1.9 km || 
|-id=705 bgcolor=#E9E9E9
| 562705 ||  || — || October 1, 2005 || Kitt Peak || Spacewatch ||  || align=right | 1.7 km || 
|-id=706 bgcolor=#E9E9E9
| 562706 ||  || — || September 18, 2010 || Mount Lemmon || Mount Lemmon Survey ||  || align=right | 1.1 km || 
|-id=707 bgcolor=#E9E9E9
| 562707 ||  || — || October 3, 2014 || Mount Lemmon || Mount Lemmon Survey ||  || align=right | 1.5 km || 
|-id=708 bgcolor=#E9E9E9
| 562708 ||  || — || March 18, 2007 || Kitt Peak || Spacewatch ||  || align=right | 2.0 km || 
|-id=709 bgcolor=#d6d6d6
| 562709 ||  || — || June 16, 2012 || Haleakala || Pan-STARRS ||  || align=right | 3.1 km || 
|-id=710 bgcolor=#d6d6d6
| 562710 ||  || — || October 8, 2008 || Mount Lemmon || Mount Lemmon Survey ||  || align=right | 2.5 km || 
|-id=711 bgcolor=#E9E9E9
| 562711 ||  || — || October 27, 2005 || Kitt Peak || Spacewatch || DOR || align=right | 1.8 km || 
|-id=712 bgcolor=#E9E9E9
| 562712 ||  || — || March 25, 2012 || Mount Lemmon || Mount Lemmon Survey ||  || align=right | 1.6 km || 
|-id=713 bgcolor=#d6d6d6
| 562713 ||  || — || October 9, 2008 || Mount Lemmon || Mount Lemmon Survey ||  || align=right | 2.2 km || 
|-id=714 bgcolor=#d6d6d6
| 562714 ||  || — || December 13, 2015 || Haleakala || Pan-STARRS ||  || align=right | 3.1 km || 
|-id=715 bgcolor=#d6d6d6
| 562715 ||  || — || September 13, 2013 || Mount Lemmon || Mount Lemmon Survey ||  || align=right | 2.8 km || 
|-id=716 bgcolor=#d6d6d6
| 562716 ||  || — || November 25, 2014 || Mount Lemmon || Mount Lemmon Survey ||  || align=right | 2.3 km || 
|-id=717 bgcolor=#E9E9E9
| 562717 ||  || — || July 30, 2009 || Kitt Peak || Spacewatch ||  || align=right | 1.8 km || 
|-id=718 bgcolor=#E9E9E9
| 562718 ||  || — || November 16, 2006 || Mount Lemmon || Mount Lemmon Survey ||  || align=right | 2.2 km || 
|-id=719 bgcolor=#E9E9E9
| 562719 ||  || — || December 6, 2015 || Mount Lemmon || Mount Lemmon Survey ||  || align=right | 2.4 km || 
|-id=720 bgcolor=#d6d6d6
| 562720 ||  || — || December 3, 2010 || Catalina || CSS ||  || align=right | 3.4 km || 
|-id=721 bgcolor=#E9E9E9
| 562721 ||  || — || February 23, 2012 || Mount Lemmon || Mount Lemmon Survey ||  || align=right | 1.9 km || 
|-id=722 bgcolor=#E9E9E9
| 562722 ||  || — || September 25, 2014 || Catalina || CSS ||  || align=right | 2.3 km || 
|-id=723 bgcolor=#d6d6d6
| 562723 ||  || — || November 20, 2009 || Kitt Peak || Spacewatch || EOS || align=right | 1.6 km || 
|-id=724 bgcolor=#E9E9E9
| 562724 ||  || — || February 4, 2012 || Haleakala || Pan-STARRS ||  || align=right | 1.5 km || 
|-id=725 bgcolor=#E9E9E9
| 562725 ||  || — || June 5, 2013 || Mount Lemmon || Mount Lemmon Survey ||  || align=right | 1.6 km || 
|-id=726 bgcolor=#E9E9E9
| 562726 ||  || — || March 11, 2008 || Catalina || CSS || EUN || align=right | 1.3 km || 
|-id=727 bgcolor=#d6d6d6
| 562727 ||  || — || August 9, 2013 || Haleakala || Pan-STARRS ||  || align=right | 2.3 km || 
|-id=728 bgcolor=#E9E9E9
| 562728 ||  || — || August 29, 2005 || Campo Imperatore || A. Boattini ||  || align=right | 1.7 km || 
|-id=729 bgcolor=#E9E9E9
| 562729 ||  || — || April 18, 2013 || Mount Lemmon || Mount Lemmon Survey ||  || align=right | 1.8 km || 
|-id=730 bgcolor=#E9E9E9
| 562730 ||  || — || January 17, 2007 || Kitt Peak || Spacewatch ||  || align=right | 1.4 km || 
|-id=731 bgcolor=#E9E9E9
| 562731 ||  || — || August 25, 2014 || Haleakala || Pan-STARRS ||  || align=right data-sort-value="0.88" | 880 m || 
|-id=732 bgcolor=#fefefe
| 562732 ||  || — || June 23, 2011 || Mount Lemmon || Mount Lemmon Survey ||  || align=right data-sort-value="0.76" | 760 m || 
|-id=733 bgcolor=#E9E9E9
| 562733 ||  || — || November 18, 2011 || Mount Lemmon || Mount Lemmon Survey ||  || align=right | 1.6 km || 
|-id=734 bgcolor=#E9E9E9
| 562734 ||  || — || August 22, 2014 || Haleakala || Pan-STARRS ||  || align=right data-sort-value="0.85" | 850 m || 
|-id=735 bgcolor=#E9E9E9
| 562735 ||  || — || June 30, 2014 || Haleakala || Pan-STARRS ||  || align=right | 1.1 km || 
|-id=736 bgcolor=#E9E9E9
| 562736 ||  || — || January 10, 2007 || Kitt Peak || Spacewatch ||  || align=right | 1.4 km || 
|-id=737 bgcolor=#d6d6d6
| 562737 ||  || — || April 29, 2012 || Kitt Peak || Spacewatch ||  || align=right | 2.2 km || 
|-id=738 bgcolor=#E9E9E9
| 562738 ||  || — || January 17, 2004 || Haleakala || AMOS ||  || align=right | 1.3 km || 
|-id=739 bgcolor=#E9E9E9
| 562739 ||  || — || January 22, 2012 || Haleakala || Pan-STARRS ||  || align=right | 1.2 km || 
|-id=740 bgcolor=#E9E9E9
| 562740 ||  || — || December 26, 2011 || Mount Lemmon || Mount Lemmon Survey ||  || align=right data-sort-value="0.79" | 790 m || 
|-id=741 bgcolor=#fefefe
| 562741 ||  || — || January 8, 2016 || Haleakala || Pan-STARRS ||  || align=right data-sort-value="0.51" | 510 m || 
|-id=742 bgcolor=#E9E9E9
| 562742 ||  || — || January 11, 2016 || Haleakala || Pan-STARRS ||  || align=right data-sort-value="0.77" | 770 m || 
|-id=743 bgcolor=#E9E9E9
| 562743 ||  || — || July 27, 2001 || Anderson Mesa || LONEOS ||  || align=right | 1.7 km || 
|-id=744 bgcolor=#E9E9E9
| 562744 ||  || — || August 25, 2014 || Haleakala || Pan-STARRS ||  || align=right | 1.7 km || 
|-id=745 bgcolor=#d6d6d6
| 562745 ||  || — || January 8, 2016 || Mount Lemmon || Pan-STARRS ||  || align=right | 2.3 km || 
|-id=746 bgcolor=#d6d6d6
| 562746 ||  || — || December 18, 2004 || Mount Lemmon || Mount Lemmon Survey ||  || align=right | 2.5 km || 
|-id=747 bgcolor=#E9E9E9
| 562747 ||  || — || March 1, 2012 || Mount Lemmon || Mount Lemmon Survey ||  || align=right | 1.6 km || 
|-id=748 bgcolor=#E9E9E9
| 562748 ||  || — || December 4, 2010 || Mount Lemmon || Mount Lemmon Survey ||  || align=right | 1.6 km || 
|-id=749 bgcolor=#E9E9E9
| 562749 ||  || — || March 13, 2012 || Mount Lemmon || Mount Lemmon Survey ||  || align=right | 1.7 km || 
|-id=750 bgcolor=#E9E9E9
| 562750 ||  || — || March 12, 2008 || Kitt Peak || Spacewatch ||  || align=right | 1.2 km || 
|-id=751 bgcolor=#E9E9E9
| 562751 ||  || — || October 14, 2010 || Mount Lemmon || Mount Lemmon Survey ||  || align=right | 1.6 km || 
|-id=752 bgcolor=#E9E9E9
| 562752 ||  || — || October 22, 2005 || Kitt Peak || Spacewatch ||  || align=right | 1.7 km || 
|-id=753 bgcolor=#E9E9E9
| 562753 ||  || — || December 14, 2010 || Mount Lemmon || Mount Lemmon Survey ||  || align=right | 1.9 km || 
|-id=754 bgcolor=#E9E9E9
| 562754 ||  || — || August 27, 2009 || Kitt Peak || Spacewatch ||  || align=right | 1.6 km || 
|-id=755 bgcolor=#E9E9E9
| 562755 ||  || — || September 18, 2010 || Mount Lemmon || Mount Lemmon Survey ||  || align=right data-sort-value="0.88" | 880 m || 
|-id=756 bgcolor=#E9E9E9
| 562756 ||  || — || March 28, 2012 || Kitt Peak || Spacewatch ||  || align=right | 1.7 km || 
|-id=757 bgcolor=#E9E9E9
| 562757 ||  || — || January 30, 2011 || Mount Lemmon || Mount Lemmon Survey ||  || align=right | 2.2 km || 
|-id=758 bgcolor=#E9E9E9
| 562758 ||  || — || October 7, 2005 || Mount Lemmon || Mount Lemmon Survey ||  || align=right | 1.4 km || 
|-id=759 bgcolor=#E9E9E9
| 562759 ||  || — || November 16, 2014 || Mount Lemmon || Mount Lemmon Survey ||  || align=right | 2.0 km || 
|-id=760 bgcolor=#E9E9E9
| 562760 ||  || — || January 27, 2007 || Mount Lemmon || Mount Lemmon Survey ||  || align=right | 1.6 km || 
|-id=761 bgcolor=#E9E9E9
| 562761 ||  || — || September 2, 2014 || Haleakala || Pan-STARRS ||  || align=right data-sort-value="0.89" | 890 m || 
|-id=762 bgcolor=#E9E9E9
| 562762 ||  || — || February 23, 2012 || Mount Lemmon || Mount Lemmon Survey ||  || align=right data-sort-value="0.99" | 990 m || 
|-id=763 bgcolor=#E9E9E9
| 562763 ||  || — || February 10, 2007 || Mount Lemmon || Mount Lemmon Survey ||  || align=right | 1.7 km || 
|-id=764 bgcolor=#E9E9E9
| 562764 ||  || — || February 9, 2008 || Mount Lemmon || Mount Lemmon Survey ||  || align=right data-sort-value="0.68" | 680 m || 
|-id=765 bgcolor=#E9E9E9
| 562765 ||  || — || April 4, 2008 || Kitt Peak || Spacewatch ||  || align=right | 1.2 km || 
|-id=766 bgcolor=#E9E9E9
| 562766 ||  || — || September 28, 2006 || Mount Lemmon || Mount Lemmon Survey ||  || align=right | 1.2 km || 
|-id=767 bgcolor=#E9E9E9
| 562767 ||  || — || October 3, 2006 || Mount Lemmon || Mount Lemmon Survey ||  || align=right data-sort-value="0.75" | 750 m || 
|-id=768 bgcolor=#E9E9E9
| 562768 ||  || — || January 27, 2007 || Mount Lemmon || Mount Lemmon Survey ||  || align=right | 1.5 km || 
|-id=769 bgcolor=#E9E9E9
| 562769 ||  || — || January 24, 2007 || Kitt Peak || Spacewatch ||  || align=right | 1.5 km || 
|-id=770 bgcolor=#E9E9E9
| 562770 ||  || — || August 29, 2009 || Kitt Peak || Spacewatch ||  || align=right | 1.7 km || 
|-id=771 bgcolor=#E9E9E9
| 562771 ||  || — || March 20, 2007 || Mount Lemmon || Mount Lemmon Survey ||  || align=right | 1.8 km || 
|-id=772 bgcolor=#E9E9E9
| 562772 ||  || — || February 9, 2007 || Kitt Peak || Spacewatch ||  || align=right | 1.6 km || 
|-id=773 bgcolor=#E9E9E9
| 562773 ||  || — || January 9, 2016 || Haleakala || Pan-STARRS ||  || align=right | 1.5 km || 
|-id=774 bgcolor=#E9E9E9
| 562774 ||  || — || March 31, 2008 || Mount Lemmon || Mount Lemmon Survey ||  || align=right | 1.0 km || 
|-id=775 bgcolor=#E9E9E9
| 562775 ||  || — || November 10, 2010 || Dauban || C. Rinner, F. Kugel ||  || align=right | 1.0 km || 
|-id=776 bgcolor=#E9E9E9
| 562776 ||  || — || August 20, 2014 || Haleakala || Pan-STARRS ||  || align=right | 1.3 km || 
|-id=777 bgcolor=#E9E9E9
| 562777 ||  || — || January 24, 2007 || Mount Lemmon || Mount Lemmon Survey ||  || align=right | 1.2 km || 
|-id=778 bgcolor=#E9E9E9
| 562778 ||  || — || March 25, 2007 || Mount Lemmon || Mount Lemmon Survey ||  || align=right | 1.9 km || 
|-id=779 bgcolor=#d6d6d6
| 562779 ||  || — || March 8, 2005 || Mount Lemmon || Mount Lemmon Survey ||  || align=right | 3.6 km || 
|-id=780 bgcolor=#E9E9E9
| 562780 ||  || — || April 20, 1993 || Kitt Peak || Spacewatch ||  || align=right | 2.0 km || 
|-id=781 bgcolor=#d6d6d6
| 562781 ||  || — || April 2, 2005 || Mount Lemmon || Mount Lemmon Survey ||  || align=right | 2.7 km || 
|-id=782 bgcolor=#E9E9E9
| 562782 ||  || — || January 19, 2012 || Haleakala || Pan-STARRS ||  || align=right | 1.3 km || 
|-id=783 bgcolor=#E9E9E9
| 562783 ||  || — || October 12, 2010 || Mount Lemmon || Mount Lemmon Survey ||  || align=right | 1.1 km || 
|-id=784 bgcolor=#E9E9E9
| 562784 ||  || — || December 31, 2007 || Kitt Peak || Spacewatch ||  || align=right data-sort-value="0.77" | 770 m || 
|-id=785 bgcolor=#E9E9E9
| 562785 ||  || — || April 4, 2008 || Mount Lemmon || Mount Lemmon Survey ||  || align=right | 1.3 km || 
|-id=786 bgcolor=#E9E9E9
| 562786 ||  || — || November 27, 2006 || Mount Lemmon || Mount Lemmon Survey ||  || align=right | 2.0 km || 
|-id=787 bgcolor=#E9E9E9
| 562787 ||  || — || November 27, 2010 || Mount Lemmon || Mount Lemmon Survey ||  || align=right | 1.1 km || 
|-id=788 bgcolor=#E9E9E9
| 562788 ||  || — || December 3, 2010 || Mount Lemmon || Mount Lemmon Survey ||  || align=right | 1.5 km || 
|-id=789 bgcolor=#E9E9E9
| 562789 ||  || — || October 28, 2010 || Mount Lemmon || Mount Lemmon Survey ||  || align=right | 1.1 km || 
|-id=790 bgcolor=#E9E9E9
| 562790 ||  || — || April 7, 2008 || Catalina || CSS ||  || align=right | 1.8 km || 
|-id=791 bgcolor=#E9E9E9
| 562791 ||  || — || April 3, 2008 || Mount Lemmon || Mount Lemmon Survey ||  || align=right | 1.3 km || 
|-id=792 bgcolor=#E9E9E9
| 562792 ||  || — || January 11, 2008 || Mount Lemmon || Mount Lemmon Survey ||  || align=right | 1.2 km || 
|-id=793 bgcolor=#E9E9E9
| 562793 ||  || — || January 4, 2016 || Haleakala || Pan-STARRS ||  || align=right | 1.1 km || 
|-id=794 bgcolor=#E9E9E9
| 562794 ||  || — || January 26, 2012 || Mount Lemmon || Mount Lemmon Survey ||  || align=right data-sort-value="0.91" | 910 m || 
|-id=795 bgcolor=#E9E9E9
| 562795 ||  || — || March 29, 2008 || Mount Lemmon || Mount Lemmon Survey ||  || align=right | 1.4 km || 
|-id=796 bgcolor=#E9E9E9
| 562796 ||  || — || October 1, 2010 || Mount Lemmon || Mount Lemmon Survey ||  || align=right data-sort-value="0.66" | 660 m || 
|-id=797 bgcolor=#E9E9E9
| 562797 ||  || — || January 7, 2016 || Haleakala || Pan-STARRS ||  || align=right | 1.2 km || 
|-id=798 bgcolor=#E9E9E9
| 562798 ||  || — || November 5, 1996 || Kitt Peak || Spacewatch ||  || align=right | 2.0 km || 
|-id=799 bgcolor=#E9E9E9
| 562799 ||  || — || September 17, 2010 || Mount Lemmon || Mount Lemmon Survey ||  || align=right | 1.4 km || 
|-id=800 bgcolor=#E9E9E9
| 562800 ||  || — || May 11, 2008 || Mount Lemmon || Mount Lemmon Survey ||  || align=right | 1.6 km || 
|}

562801–562900 

|-bgcolor=#E9E9E9
| 562801 ||  || — || August 28, 2014 || Haleakala || Pan-STARRS ||  || align=right data-sort-value="0.83" | 830 m || 
|-id=802 bgcolor=#E9E9E9
| 562802 ||  || — || February 28, 2008 || Mount Lemmon || Mount Lemmon Survey ||  || align=right data-sort-value="0.63" | 630 m || 
|-id=803 bgcolor=#E9E9E9
| 562803 ||  || — || April 13, 2008 || Mount Lemmon || Mount Lemmon Survey ||  || align=right | 1.2 km || 
|-id=804 bgcolor=#d6d6d6
| 562804 ||  || — || April 28, 2011 || Kitt Peak || Spacewatch ||  || align=right | 3.1 km || 
|-id=805 bgcolor=#d6d6d6
| 562805 ||  || — || November 22, 2014 || Haleakala || Pan-STARRS ||  || align=right | 3.1 km || 
|-id=806 bgcolor=#d6d6d6
| 562806 ||  || — || January 9, 2016 || Haleakala || Pan-STARRS ||  || align=right | 3.0 km || 
|-id=807 bgcolor=#E9E9E9
| 562807 ||  || — || January 4, 2016 || Haleakala || Pan-STARRS ||  || align=right data-sort-value="0.99" | 990 m || 
|-id=808 bgcolor=#E9E9E9
| 562808 ||  || — || August 8, 2013 || Siding Spring || Spacewatch ||  || align=right | 1.7 km || 
|-id=809 bgcolor=#E9E9E9
| 562809 ||  || — || January 4, 2016 || Haleakala || Pan-STARRS ||  || align=right | 1.8 km || 
|-id=810 bgcolor=#E9E9E9
| 562810 ||  || — || January 4, 2011 || Mount Lemmon || Mount Lemmon Survey ||  || align=right | 1.7 km || 
|-id=811 bgcolor=#d6d6d6
| 562811 ||  || — || March 17, 2012 || Mount Lemmon || Mount Lemmon Survey ||  || align=right | 2.4 km || 
|-id=812 bgcolor=#E9E9E9
| 562812 ||  || — || March 15, 2012 || Mount Lemmon || Mount Lemmon Survey ||  || align=right | 1.2 km || 
|-id=813 bgcolor=#d6d6d6
| 562813 ||  || — || October 23, 2009 || Mount Lemmon || Mount Lemmon Survey ||  || align=right | 1.8 km || 
|-id=814 bgcolor=#d6d6d6
| 562814 ||  || — || November 26, 2014 || Haleakala || Pan-STARRS ||  || align=right | 2.7 km || 
|-id=815 bgcolor=#E9E9E9
| 562815 ||  || — || April 3, 2008 || Kitt Peak || Spacewatch ||  || align=right | 1.1 km || 
|-id=816 bgcolor=#E9E9E9
| 562816 ||  || — || July 15, 2013 || Haleakala || Pan-STARRS ||  || align=right | 1.8 km || 
|-id=817 bgcolor=#E9E9E9
| 562817 ||  || — || November 8, 2010 || Kitt Peak || Spacewatch ||  || align=right | 1.8 km || 
|-id=818 bgcolor=#d6d6d6
| 562818 ||  || — || December 8, 2010 || Mount Lemmon || Mount Lemmon Survey ||  || align=right | 2.6 km || 
|-id=819 bgcolor=#E9E9E9
| 562819 ||  || — || October 28, 2014 || Haleakala || Pan-STARRS ||  || align=right | 2.0 km || 
|-id=820 bgcolor=#d6d6d6
| 562820 ||  || — || November 22, 2009 || Kitt Peak || Spacewatch ||  || align=right | 2.7 km || 
|-id=821 bgcolor=#d6d6d6
| 562821 ||  || — || November 21, 2009 || Mount Lemmon || Mount Lemmon Survey ||  || align=right | 3.5 km || 
|-id=822 bgcolor=#d6d6d6
| 562822 ||  || — || August 26, 2013 || Haleakala || Pan-STARRS ||  || align=right | 2.5 km || 
|-id=823 bgcolor=#d6d6d6
| 562823 ||  || — || September 16, 2003 || Kitt Peak || Spacewatch ||  || align=right | 2.1 km || 
|-id=824 bgcolor=#d6d6d6
| 562824 ||  || — || December 26, 2014 || Haleakala || Pan-STARRS ||  || align=right | 3.0 km || 
|-id=825 bgcolor=#d6d6d6
| 562825 ||  || — || April 12, 2011 || Mount Lemmon || Mount Lemmon Survey ||  || align=right | 2.5 km || 
|-id=826 bgcolor=#E9E9E9
| 562826 ||  || — || January 1, 2016 || Haleakala || Pan-STARRS ||  || align=right | 1.9 km || 
|-id=827 bgcolor=#E9E9E9
| 562827 ||  || — || November 4, 2010 || Mount Lemmon || Mount Lemmon Survey ||  || align=right | 1.6 km || 
|-id=828 bgcolor=#E9E9E9
| 562828 ||  || — || January 2, 2016 || Haleakala || Pan-STARRS ||  || align=right data-sort-value="0.80" | 800 m || 
|-id=829 bgcolor=#E9E9E9
| 562829 ||  || — || December 20, 2006 || Mount Lemmon || Mount Lemmon Survey ||  || align=right | 2.4 km || 
|-id=830 bgcolor=#E9E9E9
| 562830 ||  || — || October 31, 2010 || Mount Lemmon || Mount Lemmon Survey ||  || align=right | 1.2 km || 
|-id=831 bgcolor=#E9E9E9
| 562831 ||  || — || January 17, 2007 || Kitt Peak || Spacewatch ||  || align=right | 2.4 km || 
|-id=832 bgcolor=#E9E9E9
| 562832 ||  || — || March 6, 2008 || Catalina || CSS ||  || align=right | 1.6 km || 
|-id=833 bgcolor=#d6d6d6
| 562833 ||  || — || June 18, 2013 || Haleakala || Pan-STARRS ||  || align=right | 2.5 km || 
|-id=834 bgcolor=#E9E9E9
| 562834 ||  || — || November 11, 2006 || Mount Lemmon || Mount Lemmon Survey ||  || align=right | 1.1 km || 
|-id=835 bgcolor=#E9E9E9
| 562835 ||  || — || December 24, 2006 || Kitt Peak || Spacewatch ||  || align=right | 2.3 km || 
|-id=836 bgcolor=#d6d6d6
| 562836 ||  || — || January 3, 2016 || Haleakala || Pan-STARRS ||  || align=right | 2.5 km || 
|-id=837 bgcolor=#d6d6d6
| 562837 ||  || — || January 3, 2016 || Haleakala || Pan-STARRS ||  || align=right | 1.8 km || 
|-id=838 bgcolor=#E9E9E9
| 562838 ||  || — || December 12, 2006 || Kitt Peak || Spacewatch ||  || align=right | 1.9 km || 
|-id=839 bgcolor=#E9E9E9
| 562839 ||  || — || March 11, 2008 || Kitt Peak || Spacewatch ||  || align=right | 1.1 km || 
|-id=840 bgcolor=#E9E9E9
| 562840 ||  || — || March 23, 2003 || Apache Point || SDSS Collaboration ||  || align=right data-sort-value="0.99" | 990 m || 
|-id=841 bgcolor=#E9E9E9
| 562841 ||  || — || August 28, 2014 || Haleakala || Pan-STARRS ||  || align=right | 1.6 km || 
|-id=842 bgcolor=#E9E9E9
| 562842 ||  || — || July 29, 2009 || Kitt Peak || Spacewatch ||  || align=right | 1.7 km || 
|-id=843 bgcolor=#E9E9E9
| 562843 ||  || — || November 13, 2010 || Mount Lemmon || Mount Lemmon Survey ||  || align=right | 1.7 km || 
|-id=844 bgcolor=#E9E9E9
| 562844 ||  || — || November 16, 2010 || Mount Lemmon || Mount Lemmon Survey ||  || align=right | 1.3 km || 
|-id=845 bgcolor=#E9E9E9
| 562845 ||  || — || January 18, 2008 || Kitt Peak || Spacewatch ||  || align=right data-sort-value="0.69" | 690 m || 
|-id=846 bgcolor=#E9E9E9
| 562846 ||  || — || July 4, 2005 || Palomar || NEAT ||  || align=right | 1.6 km || 
|-id=847 bgcolor=#E9E9E9
| 562847 ||  || — || January 10, 2007 || Kitt Peak || Spacewatch ||  || align=right | 1.5 km || 
|-id=848 bgcolor=#E9E9E9
| 562848 ||  || — || October 27, 2005 || Kitt Peak || Spacewatch ||  || align=right | 1.8 km || 
|-id=849 bgcolor=#E9E9E9
| 562849 ||  || — || January 22, 2012 || Haleakala || Pan-STARRS ||  || align=right | 1.2 km || 
|-id=850 bgcolor=#E9E9E9
| 562850 ||  || — || January 3, 2016 || Haleakala || Pan-STARRS ||  || align=right | 1.1 km || 
|-id=851 bgcolor=#E9E9E9
| 562851 ||  || — || October 26, 2014 || Observatorio Cala || I. d. l. Cueva, J. L. Ferrer ||  || align=right | 1.9 km || 
|-id=852 bgcolor=#E9E9E9
| 562852 ||  || — || August 20, 2014 || Haleakala || Pan-STARRS ||  || align=right data-sort-value="0.71" | 710 m || 
|-id=853 bgcolor=#E9E9E9
| 562853 ||  || — || January 4, 2016 || Haleakala || Pan-STARRS ||  || align=right | 1.5 km || 
|-id=854 bgcolor=#E9E9E9
| 562854 ||  || — || December 2, 2010 || Mount Lemmon || Mount Lemmon Survey ||  || align=right | 1.8 km || 
|-id=855 bgcolor=#E9E9E9
| 562855 ||  || — || January 4, 2016 || Haleakala || Pan-STARRS ||  || align=right | 1.8 km || 
|-id=856 bgcolor=#E9E9E9
| 562856 ||  || — || December 28, 2011 || Mount Lemmon || Mount Lemmon Survey ||  || align=right | 1.2 km || 
|-id=857 bgcolor=#E9E9E9
| 562857 ||  || — || November 3, 2010 || Mount Lemmon || Mount Lemmon Survey ||  || align=right | 1.3 km || 
|-id=858 bgcolor=#E9E9E9
| 562858 ||  || — || July 31, 2014 || Haleakala || Pan-STARRS ||  || align=right | 1.2 km || 
|-id=859 bgcolor=#E9E9E9
| 562859 ||  || — || September 20, 2014 || Haleakala || Pan-STARRS ||  || align=right | 1.7 km || 
|-id=860 bgcolor=#E9E9E9
| 562860 ||  || — || October 29, 2010 || Mount Lemmon || Mount Lemmon Survey ||  || align=right | 1.3 km || 
|-id=861 bgcolor=#E9E9E9
| 562861 ||  || — || October 11, 2010 || Mount Lemmon || Mount Lemmon Survey ||  || align=right | 1.1 km || 
|-id=862 bgcolor=#E9E9E9
| 562862 ||  || — || January 4, 2016 || Haleakala || Pan-STARRS ||  || align=right | 1.8 km || 
|-id=863 bgcolor=#E9E9E9
| 562863 ||  || — || January 4, 2016 || Haleakala || Pan-STARRS ||  || align=right | 1.8 km || 
|-id=864 bgcolor=#E9E9E9
| 562864 ||  || — || August 30, 2014 || Haleakala || Pan-STARRS ||  || align=right data-sort-value="0.67" | 670 m || 
|-id=865 bgcolor=#d6d6d6
| 562865 ||  || — || January 28, 2011 || Mount Lemmon || Mount Lemmon Survey ||  || align=right | 1.9 km || 
|-id=866 bgcolor=#E9E9E9
| 562866 ||  || — || October 26, 2005 || Kitt Peak || Spacewatch ||  || align=right | 1.5 km || 
|-id=867 bgcolor=#E9E9E9
| 562867 ||  || — || January 7, 2016 || Haleakala || Pan-STARRS ||  || align=right | 1.2 km || 
|-id=868 bgcolor=#E9E9E9
| 562868 ||  || — || September 13, 2005 || Kitt Peak || Spacewatch ||  || align=right | 1.4 km || 
|-id=869 bgcolor=#E9E9E9
| 562869 ||  || — || January 28, 2007 || Kitt Peak || Spacewatch ||  || align=right | 1.7 km || 
|-id=870 bgcolor=#E9E9E9
| 562870 ||  || — || July 25, 2014 || Haleakala || Pan-STARRS ||  || align=right data-sort-value="0.73" | 730 m || 
|-id=871 bgcolor=#E9E9E9
| 562871 ||  || — || July 16, 2004 || Cerro Tololo || Cerro Tololo Obs. ||  || align=right | 2.0 km || 
|-id=872 bgcolor=#E9E9E9
| 562872 ||  || — || August 28, 2014 || Haleakala || Pan-STARRS ||  || align=right data-sort-value="0.70" | 700 m || 
|-id=873 bgcolor=#E9E9E9
| 562873 ||  || — || September 14, 2005 || Kitt Peak || Spacewatch ||  || align=right | 1.2 km || 
|-id=874 bgcolor=#E9E9E9
| 562874 ||  || — || February 27, 2012 || Haleakala || Pan-STARRS ||  || align=right | 2.1 km || 
|-id=875 bgcolor=#E9E9E9
| 562875 ||  || — || January 8, 2016 || Haleakala || Pan-STARRS ||  || align=right | 1.5 km || 
|-id=876 bgcolor=#E9E9E9
| 562876 ||  || — || September 19, 2014 || Haleakala || Pan-STARRS ||  || align=right | 2.1 km || 
|-id=877 bgcolor=#fefefe
| 562877 ||  || — || December 31, 2007 || Kitt Peak || Spacewatch ||  || align=right data-sort-value="0.97" | 970 m || 
|-id=878 bgcolor=#E9E9E9
| 562878 ||  || — || January 27, 2007 || Mount Lemmon || Mount Lemmon Survey ||  || align=right | 1.7 km || 
|-id=879 bgcolor=#d6d6d6
| 562879 ||  || — || January 11, 2011 || Kitt Peak || Spacewatch ||  || align=right | 1.6 km || 
|-id=880 bgcolor=#d6d6d6
| 562880 ||  || — || January 10, 2011 || Mount Lemmon || Mount Lemmon Survey ||  || align=right | 3.4 km || 
|-id=881 bgcolor=#E9E9E9
| 562881 ||  || — || January 27, 2007 || Kitt Peak || Spacewatch ||  || align=right | 1.8 km || 
|-id=882 bgcolor=#E9E9E9
| 562882 ||  || — || August 12, 2013 || Haleakala || Pan-STARRS ||  || align=right | 2.0 km || 
|-id=883 bgcolor=#E9E9E9
| 562883 ||  || — || November 22, 2014 || Haleakala || Pan-STARRS ||  || align=right | 1.8 km || 
|-id=884 bgcolor=#d6d6d6
| 562884 ||  || — || April 25, 2007 || Kitt Peak || Spacewatch ||  || align=right | 2.7 km || 
|-id=885 bgcolor=#d6d6d6
| 562885 ||  || — || November 29, 2014 || Mount Lemmon || Mount Lemmon Survey ||  || align=right | 2.8 km || 
|-id=886 bgcolor=#d6d6d6
| 562886 ||  || — || January 30, 2011 || Haleakala || Pan-STARRS ||  || align=right | 2.4 km || 
|-id=887 bgcolor=#E9E9E9
| 562887 ||  || — || August 27, 2014 || Haleakala || Pan-STARRS ||  || align=right | 1.1 km || 
|-id=888 bgcolor=#E9E9E9
| 562888 ||  || — || September 22, 2009 || Kitt Peak || Spacewatch ||  || align=right | 1.9 km || 
|-id=889 bgcolor=#E9E9E9
| 562889 ||  || — || November 16, 2006 || Kitt Peak || Spacewatch ||  || align=right | 1.1 km || 
|-id=890 bgcolor=#E9E9E9
| 562890 ||  || — || January 27, 2007 || Kitt Peak || Spacewatch ||  || align=right | 1.9 km || 
|-id=891 bgcolor=#E9E9E9
| 562891 ||  || — || January 22, 2002 || Kitt Peak || Spacewatch ||  || align=right | 1.8 km || 
|-id=892 bgcolor=#E9E9E9
| 562892 ||  || — || October 29, 2014 || Haleakala || Pan-STARRS ||  || align=right | 1.6 km || 
|-id=893 bgcolor=#E9E9E9
| 562893 ||  || — || January 30, 2011 || Mount Lemmon || Mount Lemmon Survey ||  || align=right | 2.4 km || 
|-id=894 bgcolor=#d6d6d6
| 562894 ||  || — || January 9, 2016 || Haleakala || Pan-STARRS ||  || align=right | 2.9 km || 
|-id=895 bgcolor=#d6d6d6
| 562895 ||  || — || November 17, 2008 || Kitt Peak || Spacewatch ||  || align=right | 3.1 km || 
|-id=896 bgcolor=#d6d6d6
| 562896 ||  || — || January 9, 2016 || Haleakala || Pan-STARRS ||  || align=right | 2.3 km || 
|-id=897 bgcolor=#E9E9E9
| 562897 ||  || — || January 9, 2016 || Haleakala || Pan-STARRS ||  || align=right | 1.4 km || 
|-id=898 bgcolor=#d6d6d6
| 562898 ||  || — || August 18, 2001 || Palomar || NEAT ||  || align=right | 4.0 km || 
|-id=899 bgcolor=#E9E9E9
| 562899 ||  || — || November 1, 2010 || Mount Lemmon || Mount Lemmon Survey ||  || align=right | 1.3 km || 
|-id=900 bgcolor=#d6d6d6
| 562900 ||  || — || January 28, 2011 || Mount Lemmon || Mount Lemmon Survey ||  || align=right | 1.9 km || 
|}

562901–563000 

|-bgcolor=#E9E9E9
| 562901 ||  || — || July 7, 2014 || Haleakala || Pan-STARRS ||  || align=right | 1.5 km || 
|-id=902 bgcolor=#E9E9E9
| 562902 ||  || — || October 22, 2014 || Mount Lemmon || Mount Lemmon Survey ||  || align=right | 1.8 km || 
|-id=903 bgcolor=#d6d6d6
| 562903 ||  || — || November 17, 2014 || Haleakala || Pan-STARRS ||  || align=right | 2.1 km || 
|-id=904 bgcolor=#d6d6d6
| 562904 ||  || — || November 4, 2013 || XuYi || PMO NEO ||  || align=right | 3.3 km || 
|-id=905 bgcolor=#d6d6d6
| 562905 ||  || — || October 10, 2002 || Palomar || NEAT ||  || align=right | 3.9 km || 
|-id=906 bgcolor=#E9E9E9
| 562906 ||  || — || January 22, 2012 || Haleakala || Pan-STARRS ||  || align=right | 1.1 km || 
|-id=907 bgcolor=#E9E9E9
| 562907 ||  || — || September 28, 2001 || Palomar || NEAT ||  || align=right | 1.6 km || 
|-id=908 bgcolor=#E9E9E9
| 562908 ||  || — || December 10, 2010 || Mount Lemmon || Mount Lemmon Survey ||  || align=right | 1.9 km || 
|-id=909 bgcolor=#E9E9E9
| 562909 ||  || — || December 9, 2015 || ESA OGS || ESA OGS ||  || align=right | 1.4 km || 
|-id=910 bgcolor=#E9E9E9
| 562910 ||  || — || November 13, 2010 || Mount Lemmon || Mount Lemmon Survey ||  || align=right | 1.3 km || 
|-id=911 bgcolor=#E9E9E9
| 562911 ||  || — || October 26, 2014 || Mount Lemmon || Mount Lemmon Survey ||  || align=right | 1.5 km || 
|-id=912 bgcolor=#d6d6d6
| 562912 ||  || — || February 5, 2011 || Haleakala || Pan-STARRS ||  || align=right | 2.0 km || 
|-id=913 bgcolor=#E9E9E9
| 562913 ||  || — || October 28, 2014 || Mount Lemmon || Mount Lemmon Survey ||  || align=right | 2.1 km || 
|-id=914 bgcolor=#E9E9E9
| 562914 ||  || — || October 26, 2014 || Mount Lemmon || Mount Lemmon Survey ||  || align=right | 1.9 km || 
|-id=915 bgcolor=#E9E9E9
| 562915 ||  || — || April 18, 2012 || Mount Lemmon || Mount Lemmon Survey ||  || align=right | 1.7 km || 
|-id=916 bgcolor=#E9E9E9
| 562916 ||  || — || February 21, 2007 || Kitt Peak || Spacewatch ||  || align=right | 1.5 km || 
|-id=917 bgcolor=#E9E9E9
| 562917 ||  || — || January 15, 2016 || Haleakala || Pan-STARRS ||  || align=right | 1.5 km || 
|-id=918 bgcolor=#E9E9E9
| 562918 ||  || — || August 22, 2014 || Haleakala || Pan-STARRS ||  || align=right data-sort-value="0.78" | 780 m || 
|-id=919 bgcolor=#E9E9E9
| 562919 ||  || — || August 27, 2009 || Kitt Peak || Spacewatch ||  || align=right | 1.9 km || 
|-id=920 bgcolor=#E9E9E9
| 562920 ||  || — || January 3, 2016 || Haleakala || Pan-STARRS ||  || align=right | 1.4 km || 
|-id=921 bgcolor=#E9E9E9
| 562921 ||  || — || January 8, 2016 || Haleakala || Pan-STARRS ||  || align=right | 1.3 km || 
|-id=922 bgcolor=#E9E9E9
| 562922 ||  || — || January 3, 2016 || Haleakala || Pan-STARRS ||  || align=right | 1.2 km || 
|-id=923 bgcolor=#E9E9E9
| 562923 ||  || — || January 1, 2016 || Mount Lemmon || Mount Lemmon Survey ||  || align=right | 1.2 km || 
|-id=924 bgcolor=#fefefe
| 562924 ||  || — || January 27, 2006 || Kitt Peak || Spacewatch || H || align=right data-sort-value="0.50" | 500 m || 
|-id=925 bgcolor=#E9E9E9
| 562925 ||  || — || November 30, 2010 || Mount Lemmon || Mount Lemmon Survey ||  || align=right | 1.5 km || 
|-id=926 bgcolor=#E9E9E9
| 562926 ||  || — || August 28, 2014 || Haleakala || Pan-STARRS ||  || align=right | 1.7 km || 
|-id=927 bgcolor=#E9E9E9
| 562927 ||  || — || January 7, 2016 || Haleakala || Pan-STARRS ||  || align=right | 1.1 km || 
|-id=928 bgcolor=#d6d6d6
| 562928 ||  || — || January 9, 2016 || Haleakala || Pan-STARRS ||  || align=right | 2.8 km || 
|-id=929 bgcolor=#E9E9E9
| 562929 ||  || — || January 9, 2016 || Haleakala || Pan-STARRS ||  || align=right | 1.3 km || 
|-id=930 bgcolor=#E9E9E9
| 562930 ||  || — || January 14, 2016 || Mount Lemmon || Mount Lemmon Survey ||  || align=right | 1.3 km || 
|-id=931 bgcolor=#E9E9E9
| 562931 ||  || — || January 4, 2016 || Haleakala || Pan-STARRS ||  || align=right | 1.6 km || 
|-id=932 bgcolor=#E9E9E9
| 562932 ||  || — || October 12, 2014 || Mount Lemmon || Mount Lemmon Survey ||  || align=right | 2.1 km || 
|-id=933 bgcolor=#E9E9E9
| 562933 ||  || — || January 4, 2016 || Haleakala || Pan-STARRS ||  || align=right | 1.7 km || 
|-id=934 bgcolor=#d6d6d6
| 562934 ||  || — || January 10, 2016 || Haleakala || Pan-STARRS || Tj (2.99) || align=right | 2.9 km || 
|-id=935 bgcolor=#E9E9E9
| 562935 ||  || — || April 19, 2012 || Mount Lemmon || Mount Lemmon Survey ||  || align=right | 1.8 km || 
|-id=936 bgcolor=#E9E9E9
| 562936 ||  || — || September 3, 2010 || Piszkesteto || Z. Kuli ||  || align=right data-sort-value="0.77" | 770 m || 
|-id=937 bgcolor=#E9E9E9
| 562937 ||  || — || March 16, 2007 || Kitt Peak || Spacewatch ||  || align=right | 1.7 km || 
|-id=938 bgcolor=#E9E9E9
| 562938 ||  || — || January 27, 2007 || Mount Lemmon || Mount Lemmon Survey ||  || align=right | 1.6 km || 
|-id=939 bgcolor=#E9E9E9
| 562939 ||  || — || October 1, 2014 || Haleakala || Pan-STARRS ||  || align=right | 2.3 km || 
|-id=940 bgcolor=#E9E9E9
| 562940 ||  || — || October 22, 2006 || Mount Lemmon || Mount Lemmon Survey ||  || align=right | 2.9 km || 
|-id=941 bgcolor=#E9E9E9
| 562941 ||  || — || July 14, 2009 || Kitt Peak || Spacewatch ||  || align=right | 2.5 km || 
|-id=942 bgcolor=#E9E9E9
| 562942 ||  || — || March 20, 2012 || Haleakala || Pan-STARRS ||  || align=right | 1.3 km || 
|-id=943 bgcolor=#d6d6d6
| 562943 ||  || — || January 30, 2011 || Haleakala || Pan-STARRS ||  || align=right | 2.2 km || 
|-id=944 bgcolor=#E9E9E9
| 562944 ||  || — || January 13, 2011 || Kitt Peak || Spacewatch ||  || align=right | 1.7 km || 
|-id=945 bgcolor=#E9E9E9
| 562945 ||  || — || March 15, 2012 || Haleakala || Pan-STARRS ||  || align=right data-sort-value="0.94" | 940 m || 
|-id=946 bgcolor=#E9E9E9
| 562946 ||  || — || August 20, 2014 || Haleakala || Pan-STARRS ||  || align=right | 1.0 km || 
|-id=947 bgcolor=#FA8072
| 562947 ||  || — || March 5, 1997 || Kitt Peak || Spacewatch ||  || align=right data-sort-value="0.40" | 400 m || 
|-id=948 bgcolor=#E9E9E9
| 562948 ||  || — || July 4, 2014 || Haleakala || Pan-STARRS ||  || align=right | 1.1 km || 
|-id=949 bgcolor=#E9E9E9
| 562949 ||  || — || February 13, 2012 || Haleakala || Pan-STARRS ||  || align=right | 1.4 km || 
|-id=950 bgcolor=#E9E9E9
| 562950 ||  || — || November 8, 2010 || Mount Lemmon || Mount Lemmon Survey ||  || align=right | 1.5 km || 
|-id=951 bgcolor=#E9E9E9
| 562951 ||  || — || December 4, 2010 || Mount Lemmon || Mount Lemmon Survey ||  || align=right | 1.9 km || 
|-id=952 bgcolor=#d6d6d6
| 562952 ||  || — || December 28, 2005 || Kitt Peak || Spacewatch ||  || align=right | 1.7 km || 
|-id=953 bgcolor=#E9E9E9
| 562953 ||  || — || February 26, 2012 || Oukaimeden || C. Rinner ||  || align=right | 1.6 km || 
|-id=954 bgcolor=#E9E9E9
| 562954 ||  || — || May 29, 2008 || Kitt Peak || Spacewatch ||  || align=right | 1.9 km || 
|-id=955 bgcolor=#E9E9E9
| 562955 ||  || — || January 27, 2007 || Mount Lemmon || Mount Lemmon Survey ||  || align=right | 1.5 km || 
|-id=956 bgcolor=#E9E9E9
| 562956 ||  || — || February 23, 2007 || Kitt Peak || Spacewatch ||  || align=right | 1.8 km || 
|-id=957 bgcolor=#fefefe
| 562957 ||  || — || September 14, 2007 || Catalina || CSS ||  || align=right data-sort-value="0.77" | 770 m || 
|-id=958 bgcolor=#E9E9E9
| 562958 ||  || — || March 14, 2012 || Mount Lemmon || Mount Lemmon Survey ||  || align=right | 1.9 km || 
|-id=959 bgcolor=#E9E9E9
| 562959 ||  || — || February 26, 2012 || Haleakala || Pan-STARRS ||  || align=right | 1.0 km || 
|-id=960 bgcolor=#E9E9E9
| 562960 ||  || — || February 27, 2012 || Haleakala || Pan-STARRS ||  || align=right | 1.7 km || 
|-id=961 bgcolor=#E9E9E9
| 562961 ||  || — || October 2, 2014 || Haleakala || Pan-STARRS ||  || align=right | 1.9 km || 
|-id=962 bgcolor=#E9E9E9
| 562962 ||  || — || March 26, 2008 || Mount Lemmon || Mount Lemmon Survey ||  || align=right data-sort-value="0.62" | 620 m || 
|-id=963 bgcolor=#E9E9E9
| 562963 ||  || — || January 29, 2007 || Kitt Peak || Spacewatch ||  || align=right | 2.0 km || 
|-id=964 bgcolor=#E9E9E9
| 562964 Hudin ||  ||  || June 3, 2014 || La Palma || EURONEAR ||  || align=right | 2.3 km || 
|-id=965 bgcolor=#E9E9E9
| 562965 ||  || — || February 3, 2012 || Haleakala || Pan-STARRS ||  || align=right data-sort-value="0.75" | 750 m || 
|-id=966 bgcolor=#E9E9E9
| 562966 ||  || — || October 24, 2005 || Kitt Peak || Spacewatch ||  || align=right | 1.9 km || 
|-id=967 bgcolor=#E9E9E9
| 562967 ||  || — || January 28, 2007 || Kitt Peak || Spacewatch ||  || align=right | 2.5 km || 
|-id=968 bgcolor=#E9E9E9
| 562968 ||  || — || May 20, 2005 || Mount Lemmon || Mount Lemmon Survey ||  || align=right data-sort-value="0.75" | 750 m || 
|-id=969 bgcolor=#E9E9E9
| 562969 ||  || — || January 8, 2016 || Haleakala || Pan-STARRS ||  || align=right | 1.4 km || 
|-id=970 bgcolor=#E9E9E9
| 562970 ||  || — || January 28, 2007 || Mount Lemmon || Mount Lemmon Survey ||  || align=right | 2.2 km || 
|-id=971 bgcolor=#E9E9E9
| 562971 ||  || — || February 23, 2012 || Mount Graham || R. P. Boyle, V. Laugalys ||  || align=right data-sort-value="0.98" | 980 m || 
|-id=972 bgcolor=#E9E9E9
| 562972 ||  || — || February 28, 2008 || Kitt Peak || Spacewatch ||  || align=right | 1.4 km || 
|-id=973 bgcolor=#E9E9E9
| 562973 ||  || — || July 13, 2013 || Haleakala || Pan-STARRS ||  || align=right | 1.4 km || 
|-id=974 bgcolor=#E9E9E9
| 562974 ||  || — || December 20, 2001 || Kitt Peak || Spacewatch ||  || align=right | 1.7 km || 
|-id=975 bgcolor=#E9E9E9
| 562975 ||  || — || May 11, 2008 || Kitt Peak || Spacewatch ||  || align=right | 2.6 km || 
|-id=976 bgcolor=#E9E9E9
| 562976 ||  || — || February 29, 2008 || Kitt Peak || Spacewatch ||  || align=right | 1.4 km || 
|-id=977 bgcolor=#E9E9E9
| 562977 ||  || — || December 13, 2006 || Mount Lemmon || Mount Lemmon Survey ||  || align=right | 1.9 km || 
|-id=978 bgcolor=#E9E9E9
| 562978 ||  || — || August 28, 2014 || Haleakala || Pan-STARRS ||  || align=right data-sort-value="0.76" | 760 m || 
|-id=979 bgcolor=#E9E9E9
| 562979 Barabásmiklós ||  ||  || September 3, 2010 || Piszkesteto || Z. Kuli ||  || align=right data-sort-value="0.74" | 740 m || 
|-id=980 bgcolor=#E9E9E9
| 562980 ||  || — || July 25, 2014 || Haleakala || Pan-STARRS ||  || align=right | 1.0 km || 
|-id=981 bgcolor=#d6d6d6
| 562981 ||  || — || October 28, 2005 || Mount Lemmon || Mount Lemmon Survey ||  || align=right | 2.5 km || 
|-id=982 bgcolor=#E9E9E9
| 562982 ||  || — || March 29, 2012 || Haleakala || Pan-STARRS ||  || align=right | 2.2 km || 
|-id=983 bgcolor=#E9E9E9
| 562983 ||  || — || October 1, 2014 || Haleakala || Pan-STARRS ||  || align=right | 1.4 km || 
|-id=984 bgcolor=#E9E9E9
| 562984 ||  || — || August 9, 2005 || Cerro Tololo || Cerro Tololo Obs. ||  || align=right | 1.4 km || 
|-id=985 bgcolor=#E9E9E9
| 562985 ||  || — || April 29, 2003 || Kitt Peak || Spacewatch ||  || align=right | 2.2 km || 
|-id=986 bgcolor=#E9E9E9
| 562986 ||  || — || December 28, 2011 || Les Engarouines || L. Bernasconi ||  || align=right | 1.3 km || 
|-id=987 bgcolor=#E9E9E9
| 562987 ||  || — || July 24, 1995 || Kitt Peak || Spacewatch ||  || align=right | 2.6 km || 
|-id=988 bgcolor=#E9E9E9
| 562988 ||  || — || January 29, 2016 || Mount Lemmon || Mount Lemmon Survey ||  || align=right | 1.5 km || 
|-id=989 bgcolor=#E9E9E9
| 562989 ||  || — || March 24, 2012 || Mount Lemmon || Mount Lemmon Survey ||  || align=right | 1.3 km || 
|-id=990 bgcolor=#E9E9E9
| 562990 ||  || — || January 8, 2016 || Haleakala || Pan-STARRS ||  || align=right | 1.9 km || 
|-id=991 bgcolor=#E9E9E9
| 562991 ||  || — || June 30, 2014 || Haleakala || Pan-STARRS ||  || align=right | 2.2 km || 
|-id=992 bgcolor=#E9E9E9
| 562992 ||  || — || September 5, 2010 || Mount Lemmon || Mount Lemmon Survey ||  || align=right data-sort-value="0.78" | 780 m || 
|-id=993 bgcolor=#E9E9E9
| 562993 ||  || — || October 27, 2006 || Mount Lemmon || Mount Lemmon Survey ||  || align=right | 1.2 km || 
|-id=994 bgcolor=#E9E9E9
| 562994 ||  || — || January 12, 2008 || Mount Lemmon || Mount Lemmon Survey ||  || align=right | 1.4 km || 
|-id=995 bgcolor=#E9E9E9
| 562995 ||  || — || August 27, 2014 || Haleakala || Pan-STARRS ||  || align=right | 1.5 km || 
|-id=996 bgcolor=#E9E9E9
| 562996 ||  || — || January 29, 2012 || Kitt Peak || Spacewatch ||  || align=right | 1.6 km || 
|-id=997 bgcolor=#E9E9E9
| 562997 ||  || — || October 25, 2014 || Mount Lemmon || Mount Lemmon Survey ||  || align=right | 1.3 km || 
|-id=998 bgcolor=#E9E9E9
| 562998 ||  || — || December 2, 2010 || Mount Lemmon || Mount Lemmon Survey ||  || align=right | 1.7 km || 
|-id=999 bgcolor=#E9E9E9
| 562999 ||  || — || September 20, 2014 || Haleakala || Pan-STARRS ||  || align=right | 1.8 km || 
|-id=000 bgcolor=#E9E9E9
| 563000 ||  || — || June 7, 2013 || Haleakala || Pan-STARRS ||  || align=right data-sort-value="0.95" | 950 m || 
|}

References

External links 
 Discovery Circumstances: Numbered Minor Planets (560001)–(565000) (IAU Minor Planet Center)

0562